= Arthur Guyton =

American physiologist and author (1919 - 2003)

Arthur C. Guyton
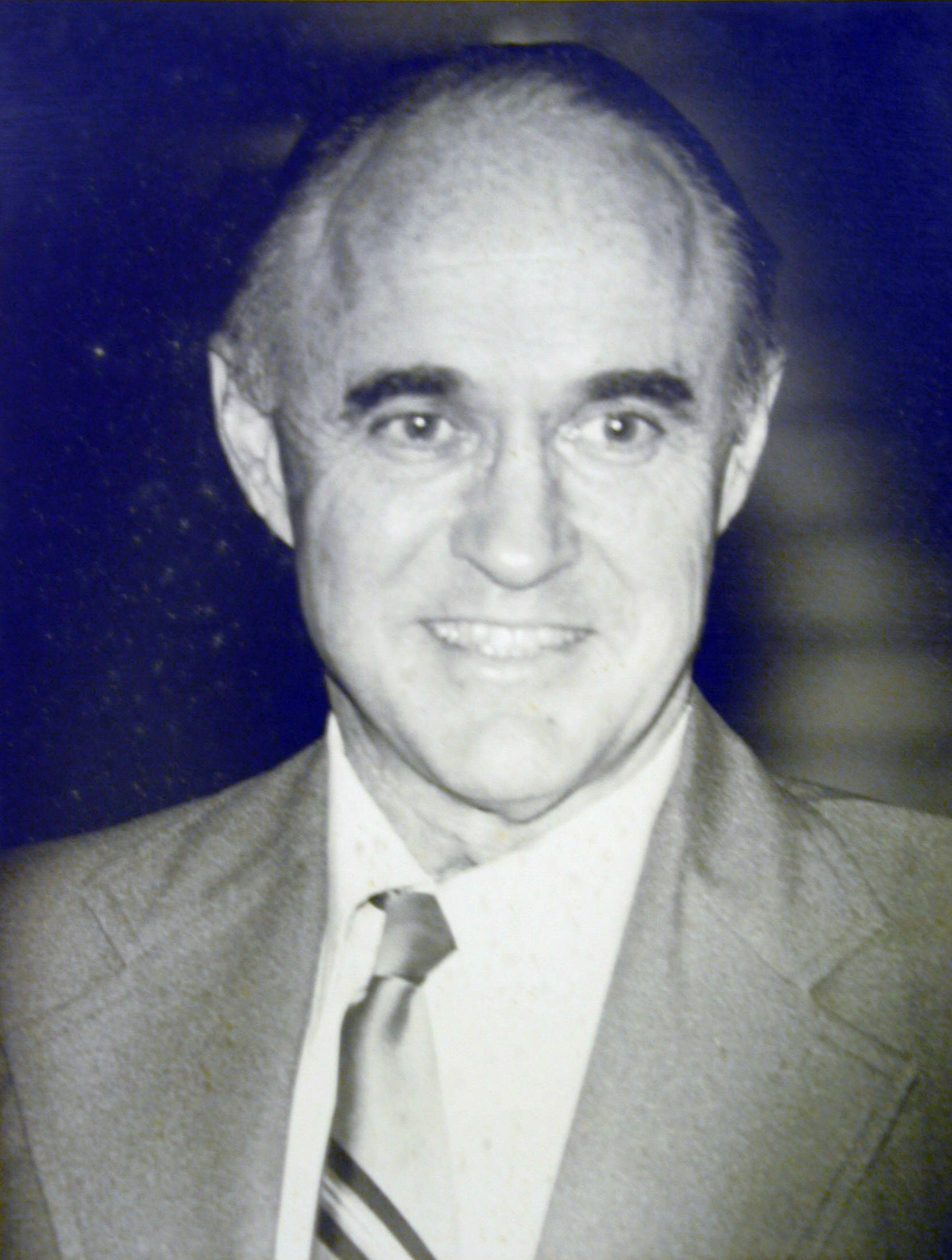
- Family photo, c. 1980
- Born: September 8, 1919; Oxford, Mississippi, US
- Died: April 3, 2003 (aged 83); Pocahontas, Mississippi, US
- Education: University of Mississippi (BA); Harvard Medical School (MD)
- Known for: Studies of the physiology of cardiac output
- Scientific career
- Fields: Physiology
- Workplaces: University of Mississippi

Arthur Clifton Guyton (September 8, 1919 – April 3, 2003) was an American physiologist best known for his studies on cardiovascular physiology and his Textbook of Medical Physiology, which quickly became the standard text on the subject in medical schools. The first edition was published in 1956, the 10th edition in 2000 (the last before Guyton's death), and the 12th edition in 2010. The 15th edition published in 2025 is the latest version available. It is the world's best-selling medical physiology textbook.

== Textbook of Medical Physiology ==
Textbook of Medical Physiology is one of the world's best-selling physiology books and has been translated into at least 13 languages (the textbook memoriam states 13, but the online memoriam states at least 15.)

From the ninth edition onwards, John E. Hall co-authored the textbook. However, all prior editions were written entirely by Guyton, with the eighth edition published in 1991. Subsequent editions, including the latest, preserve his legacy within the title, Guyton and Hall Textbook of Medical Physiology. He has also published renowned textbooks on neurosciences.

== Cardiovascular physiology ==
Guyton is most famous for his experiments in the 1950s which studied the physiology of cardiac output and its relationship with the peripheral circulation (see e.g. chapter 23 of Guyton 1976 edition, or chapter 20 of both Guyton 1991 and Guyton & Hall 2006 edition).

It was this work which overturned the conventional wisdom that it was the heart itself that controlled cardiac output. Guyton instead demonstrated that it was the need of the body tissues for oxygen which was the true regulator of cardiac output. The "Guyton Curves" which describe the relationship between right atrial pressure and cardiac output form the basis for understanding the physiology of circulation. This subject is well described in Guyton's textbook which contains references to the original publications.

=== Guyton model ===
The horizontal axis of Guyton diagram represents right atrial pressure or central venous pressure, and the vertical axis represents cardiac output or venous return. The red curve sloping upward to the right is the cardiac output curve, and the blue curve sloping downward to the right is the venous return curve. A steady state is formed at the point where the two curves meet.

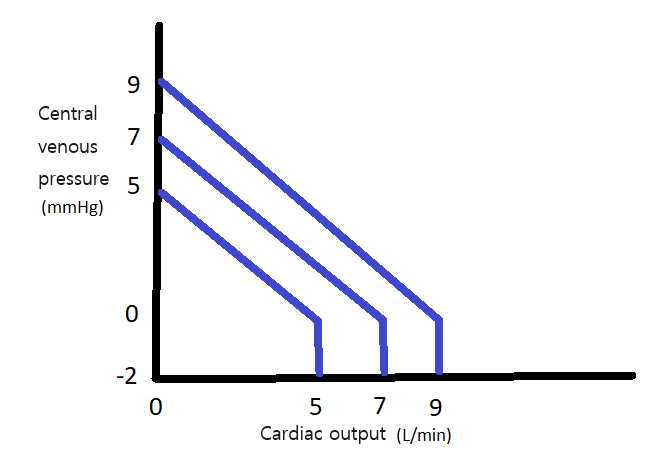
Trend of central venous pressure as a consequence of variations in cardiac output. The three functions indicate the trend in physiological conditions (in the centre), in those of decreased preload (e.g. in hemorrhage, bottom curve) and in those of increased preload (e.g. following transfusion, top curve).

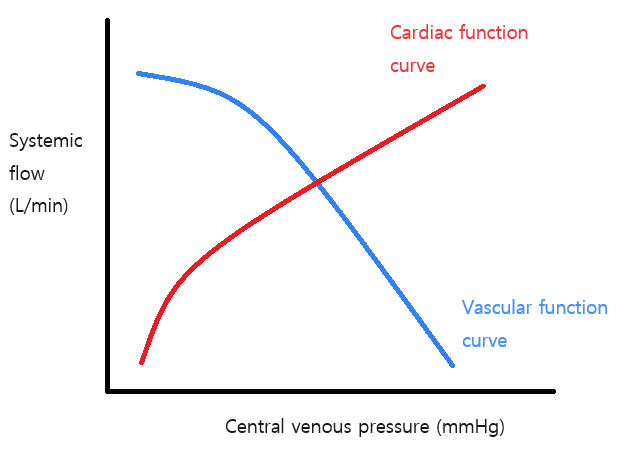
The cardiac function curve expresses how systemic flow changes as a function of the central venous pressure; it represents the Frank-Starling mechanism. The vascular function curve expresses how "central venous pressure" changes as a function of "systemic flow". Note that, for cardiac function curve, "central venous pressure" is the independent variable and "systemic flow" is the dependent variable; for vascular function curve, the opposite is true.

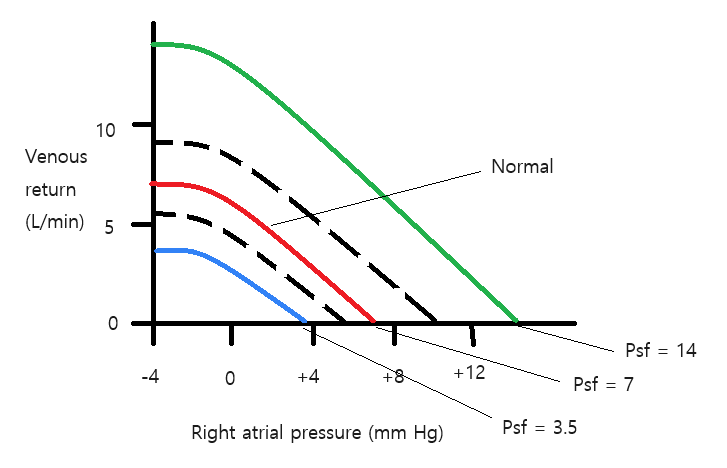
Venous return curves showing the normal curve when the mean systemic filling pressure (Psf) is 7 mm Hg and the effect of altering the Psf to 3.5, 7, or 14 mm Hg.

Guyton's model uses right atrial pressure as an independent variable (causal variable) but it's incorrect. The cardiac output is the independent variable.

In Guyton model's venous return curve, he plotted the right atrial pressure on the x-axis and it can suggest incorrectly that the right atrial pressure was the independent variable in the experiments.

== Respiratory Model and Control ==
'See also A Mathematical Model of the Human Respiratory Control System

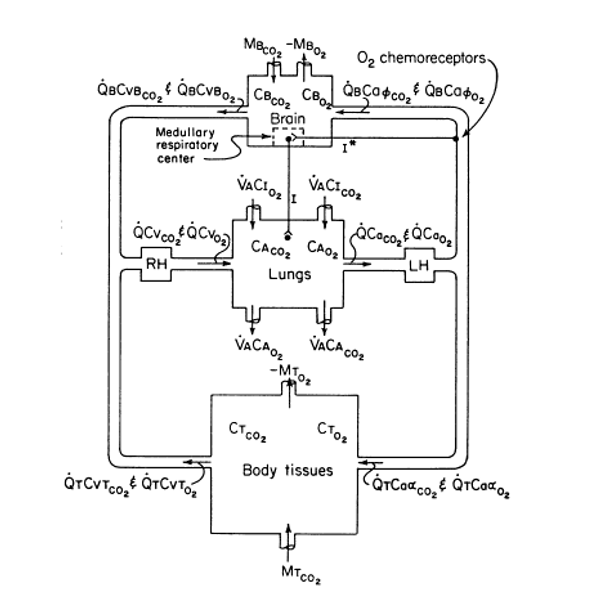
Modeling Respiratory system

== Biography ==
Arthur Guyton was born in Oxford, Mississippi to Billy S. Guyton, a respected eye, ear, nose, and throat specialist, and Kate Smallwood Guyton, a mathematics and physics teacher who had been a missionary in China before marriage.

Guyton initially intended to be a cardiovascular surgeon but became partially paralysed after being infected with polio in 1946 during his final year of residency training. Suffering paralysis in his right leg, left arm, and both shoulders, he spent nine months in Warm Springs, Georgia, recuperating and building the first motorized wheelchair controlled by a "joystick", a motorized hoist for lifting patients, special leg braces, and other devices to aid the disabled. For these inventions, he received a Presidential Citation.

Due to his disability, Guyton had to abandon his plan to become a surgeon. Instead, he concentrated on physiology research and teaching, and became the head of the University of Mississippi department of physiology and biophysics. He retired as department chair in 1989 but continued as emeritus professor up until his death in a car accident on April 3, 2003, less than one month after his first great-grandchild, Madeleine Guyton, was born.

Guyton had ten children, who all went on to become physicians, including an ophthalmology professor, an internal medicine professor, an endocrinologist, a rheumatologist, two anaesthesiologists, two cardiothoracic surgeons, and two orthopaedic surgeons. Eight of his children attended Harvard Medical School, one attended Duke University School of Medicine, and one attended the University of Miami's medical school after obtaining a PhD from Harvard.

== Obituary ==
Guyton died on April 3, 2003, in a car accident in Pocahontas, Mississippi. His obituary states "unlike most major textbooks, which often have as many as 10–20 authors", the first eight editions "were written entirely by Guyton with a new edition always arriving on schedule for nearly 40 years. This feat is unprecedented for any physiology or medical text. His textbook is unique in the history of medical publishing".

His obituary notes that he triumphed over polio:

He had a special ability to inspire people through his indomitable spirit", and "his courage in the face of adversity humbled us. He would not succumb to the crippling effects of polio. It is very unlikely that a repairman ever crossed his doorstep, except perhaps for a social visit. He and his children not only built their home, but also repaired each and every malfunctioning appliance and home device no matter the difficulty or the physical challenge. He built a hoist to lower himself into the "hole" beneath their house to repair the furnace and septic lines when calling a repairman seemed to be the only option to those who did not know him well. On trips to meetings, he walked long distances across airport terminals when using a wheelchair would have been much easier. His struggle to rise from his chair and walk to the podium for a lecture was moving, but the audience was always more impressed when he forcefully articulated his brilliant concepts.

His obituary in The Physiologist journal, and Memoriam in the 11th edition of his book, are largely verbatim of each other, including as below:

Arthur Guyton's research contributions, which include more than 600 papers and 40 books, are legendary and place him among the greatest figures in the history of cardiovascular physiology. His research covered virtually all areas of cardiovascular regulation and led to many seminal concepts that are now an integral part of the understanding of cardiovascular disorders such as hypertension, heart failure, and edema. It is difficult to discuss cardiovascular regulation without including his concepts of cardiac output and venous return, negative interstitial fluid pressure and regulation of tissue fluid volume and edema, regulation of tissue blood flow and whole body blood flow auto-regulation, renal-pressure natriuresis, and long-term blood pressure regulation.

The Textbook Memoriam continues: "Indeed, his concepts of cardiovascular regulation are found in virtually every major textbook of physiology. They have become so familiar that their origin is sometimes forgotten".
