= Quantium Medical Cardiac Output =

quantium Medical Cardiac Output
- Purpose: estimate cardiac output

quantium Medical Cardiac Output (qCO) uses impedance cardiography in a simple, continuous, and non-invasive way to estimate the cardiac output (CO) and other hemodynamic parameters such as the stroke volume (SV) and cardiac index (CI). The CO estimated by the qCO monitor is referred to as the "qCO". The impedance plethysmography allows determining changes in volume of the body tissues based on the measurement of the electric impedance at the body surface.

The assessment of cardiac output (CO) is important because it reveals the main cardiac function: the supply of blood to tissues. CO reflects the hemodynamic flow and hence the transport of oxygen; its clinical applications by non-invasive continuous hemodynamic monitoring are especially useful for some medical specialties like anaesthesiology, emergency care and cardiology, for example to prevent hypoperfusion and to guide fluid administration.

Several authors advocate the high reliability and good correlation of cardiography impedance compared to others techniques more established. Nevertheless, some detractors complain about the sensitivity of the technique to artefacts such as the electromyography or breathing movements.

== qCO calculated ==
=== Impedance cardiography ===
The Impedance Cardiography (ICG or Ztot) signal represents the changes in the thoracic impedance due to variations in the blood flow. In practice, the raw Ztot signal (in O) is transformed to the –dZ/dt waveform (filtered negative first derivative, in O x s-1) by using the first derivative to remark the inflection points of the raw Ztot signal. The most important characteristic points of the –dZ/dt waveform are B, C, and X points (see figure 2). All these points are associated with distinct physiological events within the systolic part of the cardiac cycle, i.e., located after the QRS complex onset. In that sense, the R wave from the ECG signal can be an important reference for detecting such events.

=== Detecting characteristic points of the ICG signal: problems and solutions. ===
The ICG signal is extremely sensitive to artifacts due to movements and respiration. Baseline variations can considerably alter the dZ/dtmax point and the dependent hemodynamic parameters. High-frequency interferences also can affect the accuracy in estimating some characteristics points, essentially the B point, affecting the LVET dependent parameters. The qCO's algorithm uses classical and advanced adaptive filtering techniques to minimize such problems with good results. The algorithm applies a band-pass filtering stage, which attenuates both the baseline drifts (due to movement or respiration) and the high-frequency signal. Also, it features Adaptive Neuro-Fuzzy Inference System (ANFIS), for higher accuracy, which is able to obliterate even artifacts such as the electrosurgical noise.

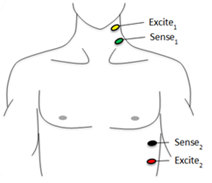
Figure 1: Recommended location of the electrodes. For using the qCO it is only necessary to place the electrodes, connect it to a PC via USB and run the software.

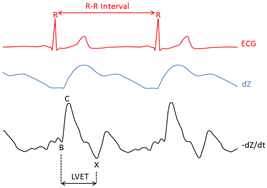
Figure 2: Time relationship between the ECG, dZ and dZ/dt waveforms. The more characteristic points of the dZ/dt waveform are identified as B, which is the opening moment to the aortic valve (identified as the local minima before the C point). The C is the maximum blood flow in the left ventricle (dZ/dtmax). The X reveals the closing of aortic valve (identified as local minima after C point) and the LVET (Left-Ventricular Ejection Time) is the time interval between the opening and closure of the aortic valve, i.e., the interval between the points B and X.

== Foundation and features of the different methods. ==
Since its discovery, the use of CO monitoring has been restricted to certain kinds of patients because of the risk of the classical procedures. Lately, new kinds of methods and devices have been developed. Nowadays, in practice, the method election is determined mainly by the features of the patients and the possibilities of the hospital to accede to this technology. Different CO monitor methods can be characterized by their invasiveness or their ability to measure continuously. The most ideal should be reliable, continuous, non-invasive, easy to use, and cost-effective. The invasive methods like the still gold standard method Swan-ganz catheter (pulmonary artery catheter), based on transcardiac thermodilution, are being replaced by its invasiveness; hence these systems will not be inspected in this document. The minimally invasive methods also require catheterization, but less harmful. One of them is the Thermodilution Transpulmonary (TDTP), developed in the late 1990s, which presents risk of iatrogenic effect effects such as pneumothorax, Bleeding, infection, thrombosis or vascular ischemia, inherent to the requirement of both arterial and central venous catheter. As a calibrating method, this system performs a thermodilution curve by measuring the changes in blood temperature due to the injection of cold serum and calculates the CO intermittently through a modified equation of Stewart-Hamilton. Furthermore, this method lets a continuous reading of the CO through the analysis of the arterial Pulse Pressure (PP) wave. Admittedly, these systems have some limitations, related for example to the thermodilution, such as thermic artifacts due to the injection of another serum or during the extracorporeal purification treatment (this therapy is required by approximately the 5% of patients in critical areas). Most of the monitors able to provide a continuous measure of the CO, are based on the analysis of the arterial blood pressure(BP) curve, called pulse contour methods. They are founded by the fact that the pulse pressure is proportional to the ejection volume; however, this is only true when aortic resistance remains constant, hence, these methods have some limitations such as obesity, which affects the arterial distensibility, or aortic regurgitation. Furthermore, the values may be modified in patients with Intra-Aortic Balloon Pumps (IABP) or unstable arterial signal as in cases of severe arrhythmias or ventricular extrasystolia. The signal can be altered also by shock or hypothermia states because of the peripheral vasoconstriction or arterial spasm. Usually, for calculating the stroke volume, the methods based on pulse wave analysis need previous and periodic calibrations that must be done in the same patient, which is a drawback. The main non-invasive methods can be classified into two groups. The first group is formed by different variations of the echocardiography and echo-Doppler techniques and the second group is comprised by the aortic bioimpedance and bioreactance.

== Benefits of using the qCO ==
Doppler or echocardiography systems cannot assess the CO continuously. The continuous assessment capability is the major advantage of the qCO device. This is especially important to predict if the patient is fluid responsive in cases of hemodynamic instability or circulatory shock, which can be assessed with a simple test named Passive Leg Raising (PLR, described in detail below), for which, the quick variations in the CO should be detected. Another benefit is the fact that qCO is fully non-invasive, thus avoiding risks for the patient. Further, it does not need to be calibrated, which allows accelerating and simplifying the monitoring, thereby, providing a large benefit for both the patients and clinicians. The Pulse Pressure Variation (PPV) method is influenced by mechanical ventilation, due to changes in the pleural pressure, hence, such monitoring should not be recommended for patients who are not being mechanically ventilated with a regular tidal volume.

== Clinical relevance of the parameters ==
=== The Cardiac Output (CO) ===
The average resting CO is 5.6 L/min for a healthy male and 4.9 L/min for a female, decreasing with age and increasing with Body Surface Area (BSA). Changes in the CO can be determined by Heart rate (HR) and Stroke Volume (SV). The SV in turn, depends on three general factors: pre-load, post-load and myocardial contractility.

Possible causes for increasing CO:	Possible causes for decreasing CO:
Increased demand of O2. (I.e. during exercise).	Deficit of ventricular filling. (Can be caused by hypovolemia).
States of decreased Systemic Vascular Resistance (SVR). (I.e. systemic inflammation).	Low ventricular emptying. (Caused by e.g. contractility alteration, valvulopathy).
Increased sympathetic response. (I.e. pain, fear, or anxiety states).	High Systemic Vascular Resistance. (E.g. caused by hypertension, vasoconstriction, and mitral insufficiency).
Other states such as pregnancy, liver disease, and hyperthyroidism.	

In the field of anesthesia, the main reason for CO monitoring during surgery are complications that can arise after the immediate postoperative period (such as hypoxemia, tachycardia, or oliguria) and also, if the therapeutic intervention becomes complex. Despite some clinicians believe that the CO monitor can be introduced only when complications emerge, it is recommended to monitor since before the induction in order to have a baseline. Fluid administration in the intraoperative period is part of the daily practice in anesthesiology. Several studies have demonstrated that the time of administering fluid therapy can be more important than the volume dispensed; thus the treatment guided by BP is primitive, whereas the functional parameters CO and SV can detect easily and quickly the preload variations In the branch of medical intensive care, the CO and other related parameters may be useful for the differential diagnosis of shock states such as hypovolemic shock, cardiogenic or septic.

=== The Stroke Volume Variation (SVV) ===
The rise of volume is the main therapy elected to improve oxygen delivery. However, approximately, only 50% of subjects respond to fluids by increasing SV. The treatment of non-responsive patients can promote deleterious effects in the pulmonary system due to the increase in extravascular fluid. Hence it is important to have a tool to determine this condition. It is called SVV to the physiological variations, due to changes in intra-thoracic pressure of spontaneous breathing, which diminish the arterial pulse pressure during inspiration and increase it during inspiration; however if the SVV decreases too much, it can be termed paradoxical pulse and can be related to different pathologies such EPOC or pericarditis. In mechanically ventilated patients, the same process takes place in reverse, due to the positive pressure. Therefore, the normal values of SVV depend on the ventilation mode, and it can be calculated through the SV with the formula: $SVV= (SV_{max} - SV_{min}) / SV_{mean}$, by a respiratory cycle or other period of time. During mechanical ventilation the goal is to maintain SVV between 10 and 15%, higher values along with a low SV may indicate the need for volume resuscitation.

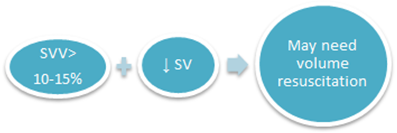

SVV may be fairly sensitive and specific used as a dynamic indicator of the volume status to answer the question: “Is your patient fluid responsive?”, compared to the conventional parameters. However, using the SVV should not be recommended to interpret the situation of patients with arrhythmias or vasodilator therapy. Also, to avoid natural variations, the patients must be under mechanical ventilation.

== Therapy and methods ==
=== The Goal Directed Therapy (GDT) ===
A critical point for fluid management in some medical specialties is to adjust the intravascular volume replacement. An incorrect practice can seriously affect the organ function and hence the outcome. Guiding fluid management using standard physiologic variables such as BP and HR, because of their regulated nature, is usually insensitive to changes in intravascular volume and may be misleading for example occulting a hypo-perfusion state. Therefore, optimizing the cardiac preload with fluid administration guided by BP is not reliable.

With the formula to achieve objectives, called Goal-Directed Therapy (GDT), Rivers (2001) demonstrated how to reduce mortality in patients with severe sepsis and septic shock through the optimization of different hemodynamic variables for a dynamic and individualized view, instead of maintaining only an adequate Arterial Pressure (AP). Later publications support that the intraoperative GDT, used to maintain adequate systemic oxygenation, can safeguard organs especially sensible from perioperative hypo-perfusion. High-risk patients or even less pernicious patients to major surgery could profit from GDT by reducing the incidence of postoperative complications, thus, improving and accelerating the outcome.

The CO measurement in cardiology provides rewarding diagnostic and prognostic information for the management of patients with left- and right-sided cardiac dysfunction. Pulmonary Arterial Hypertension (PAH) may diminish the CO and promote right-sided heart failure, which untreated could be fatal. A simultaneous measurement of the preload also enables to assay the blood flow levels to discard states of hypovolemia or hypervolemia.

=== The Passive Leg Raising test (PLR) ===
For the fluid responsiveness evaluation, a small amount of solution can be previously administered as a tester, though this method is not recommended because it is irreversible. Another option is the passive leg raising test, which consists of inducing a fast and transient hemodynamic challenge without fluid infusion. By modifying the patient's position, a volume of venous blood from the lower body toward the right heart it is transferred, simulating an infusion of approximately 300 ml.

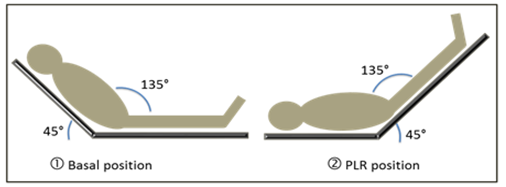
Figure 3: For maximal reliability, the PLR test must be performed following some rules. One possible variation of PLR starts from the semi-recumbent position 1. The second step comprises going down the trunk and raise legs maintaining the angle between them using the automatic motion of the bed for avoiding artifacts. Finally, the third step goes back to position 1 to ensure that the subject recovers the previous hemodynamic parameters.

An increase in the CO (of = 10%) and AP within the next 60–90 seconds after leg elevation indicates a positive result, suggesting that the patient is fluid responsive and might benefit from additional fluid. By contrast if the test is negative, the patient should not be treated as it would be harmful. The fluid overload can raise extravascular water causing deleterious side effects in lungs.

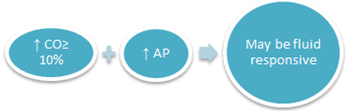

=== The Frank Starling’s curve ===
The basic mechanisms for the hemodynamic regulation are:

- Intrinsically cardiac regulation in the function of the venous return.
- Control of HR by Autonomic Nervous System (ANS).

The explanation why the heart is capable of adapting to growing volumes of blood flow is called 'Frank-Starling's mechanism', which says that the more distended is the muscle during the filling, the more strength of contraction and quantity of blood pumped by the left ventricle to the aorta. When the heart reaches a physiological limitation, then blood pumping cannot increase, although the venous return is further increased. The SVV contributes to knowing the state of euvolemia in ventilated patients and designates the point on the Frank-Starling curve where the patient is.

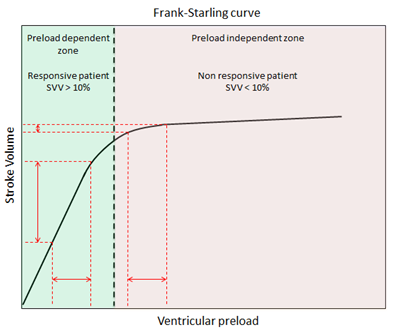
Figure 4: The link between the fiber length and myocardial contractile force is illustrated. Within the preload dependent zone, the SV raises while the ventricular preload does too, however, in the preload independent zone a higher preload or further fluid boluses will not improve the SV.

=== The current qCO utilities can be summarized in ===
- In general terms to help diagnose, triage, or choose and anticipate the response to treatment in different cases such as cardiopathies, heart failure, hypertension, trauma, sepsis, burn hypovolemic shock or dyspnoea.
- Guide the GDT, for the administration of fluids or inotropes in order to optimize preload, contractility, and afterload.
- Monitoring high-risk patients undergoing any surgery (as long as it does not affect the thorax morphology).
- Improve the cost-efficiency relationship of the hospital, mainly by improving the outcome which implies a shorter hospital stay, thus, saving highly expensive resources, against the low cost of the device and electrodes (which can be the classic electrodes for monitoring the EKG).

== Other parameters provided by the qCO ==
In addition to cardiac function, the qCO also evaluates indirectly other related fields as is the parasympathetic nervous system (PNS), through the evaluation of the R-R intervals and Heart Rate Variability (HRV or beat-to-beat variation). Since 1960 the HRV has been analyzed. Nowadays, it has become a widely used tool for study the ANS modulation in clinical areas such as cardiology. Even though, its utility is not well known yet. The interest lies in its profound relationship with breathing, ANS, and cardiac autonomic regulation.

The most relevant and validated capacity is to prognosticate the coronary heart disease patients, accordingly, a reduced HRV is related to a high risk of mortality after myocardial infarction. Another important point is the fact that Inflammation is stimulated by the effect of the parasympathetic nervous system and inhibited by the sympathetic, thereby, could also be measured through the R-R intervals to guide the physician.

Several reports maintain that the HRV analysis is a highly accurate indicator of the autonomic dysfunction in alcoholic and diabetic subjects. Also, it is growing interest in applying the HRV to evaluate a neurologic function, and the best results have been found out in psychiatric patients. Regarding the anesthesia and critical care fields, the ANS dysfunction should be considered because it is related to high morbidity and mortality in patients undergoing surgery under the general anesthesia effect. Naturally, events as the tracheal intubation and inhalation agents can produce quick variations in ANS. Also, should be regarded in critical patients who may show a worse outcome when it is added to certain illnesses such as sepsis [24,25].

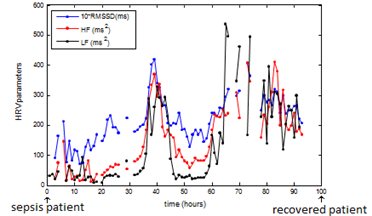
Figure 5: HRV parameters recorded during the recovering of a patient with sepsis are depicted. It is noticeable the growing trend according to the improving. Hence, this data could be used to drive a prognosis.

The HRV depends on the age, sex, and also other physiological variations such as hormonal components, genetics, exercise, environmental factors, thermoregulation, etc. A controlled recording could explain variations in ANS due to physiology, pharmacology or pathology

There exist several systems for quantifying the HRV, nevertheless, none of them have shown better result than others. The most widely used methods for the HRV analysis can be grouped under time-domain and frequency-domain, the qCO offers the following values:

Parameter	Foundation	Clinical significance
Energy HF band	(High Frequency) Energy in the 0.15-0.4 Hz frequency bandwidth.	Represents the PNS activity, therefore, the HF components increase when the HR decreases. ? PNS ? ? HR ?? HF
RMSSD	(Root Mean Square Successive Deference) Short-term variations of RR intervals.	Observes the influence of the PNS on the cardiovascular system.
pNN50	Percentage of RR intervals that differ more than 50 ms.	A high value of pNN50 gives us information about the spontaneous variation of the HR.
SDSD	Standard deviation of successive differences of the RR intervals.	Provides long-term information oncorr the variations.

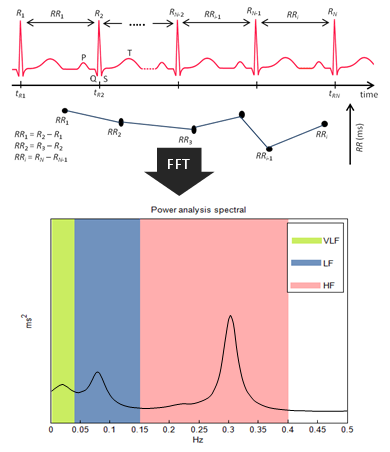
Figure 6: The Fast Fourier Transformation (FFT) and spectral methods let quantify components of the HRV, by classifying the frequencies in three regions: High (HF= 0.15-0.4 Hz), Low (LF= 0.04-0.15 Hz) and Very-Low (VLF= 0.003-0.04 Hz) frequency powers. The most valuable zone is the HF because is modulated exclusively by the SNP. The LF is regulated by both, the PNS and SNS (Sympathetic Nervous System). And the VLF modulation is unclear, but it is thought that could be influenced by the PNS and renin-angiotensin-aldosterone system.
