= Cardiac function curve =

A cardiac function curve is a graph showing the relationship between right atrial pressure (x-axis) and cardiac output (y-axis). Superimposition of the cardiac function curve and venous return curve is used in one hemodynamic model.

== Shape of curve ==
The horizontal axis of Guyton diagram represents right atrial pressure or central venous pressure, and the vertical axis represents cardiac output or venous return. The red curve sloping upward to the right is the cardiac output curve, and the blue curve sloping downward to the right is the venous return curve. A steady state is formed at the point where the two curves meet.

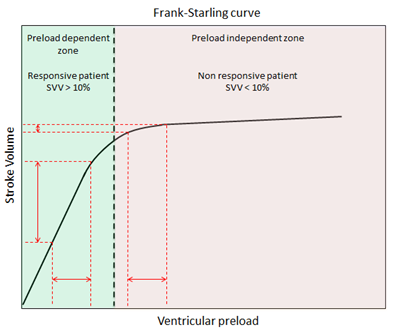
Cardiac function curve in Frank–Starling's law, illustrating stroke volume (SV) as a function of preload

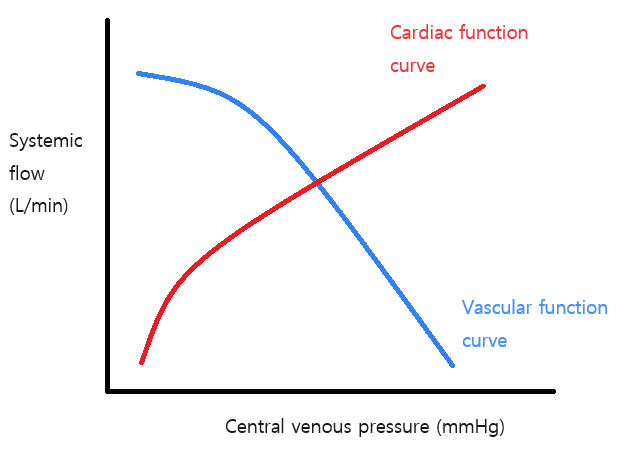
The cardiac function curve expresses how systemic flow changes as a function of the central venous pressure; it represents the Frank-Starling mechanism. The vascular function curve expresses how "central venous pressure" changes as a function of "systemic flow". Note that, for cardiac function curve, "central venous pressure" is the independent variable and "systemic flow" is the dependent variable; for vascular function curve, the opposite is true.

It shows a steep relationship at relatively low filling pressures and a plateau, where further stretch is not possible and so increases in pressure have little effect on output. The pressures where there is a steep relationship lie within the normal range of right atrial pressure (RAP) found in the healthy human during life. This range is about -1 to +2 mmHg. The higher pressures normally occur only in disease, in conditions such as heart failure, where the heart is unable to pump forward all the blood returning to it and so the pressure builds up in the right atrium and the great veins. Swollen neck veins are often an indicator of this type of heart failure.

At low right atrial pressures this graph serves as a graphic demonstration of the Frank–Starling mechanism, that is as more blood is returned to the heart, more blood is pumped from it without extrinsic signals.

== Changes in the cardiac function curve ==
In vivo however, extrinsic factors such as an increase in activity of the sympathetic nerves, and a decrease in vagal tone cause the heart to beat more frequently and more forcefully. This alters the cardiac function curve, shifting it upwards. This allows the heart to cope with the required cardiac output at a relatively low right atrial pressure. We get what is known as a family of cardiac function curves, as the heart rate increases before the plateau is reached, and without the RAP having to rise dramatically to stretch the heart more and get the Starling effect.

In vivo sympathetic outflow within the myocardium is probably best described by the time honored description of the sinoatrial tree branching out to Purkinges fibers. Parasympathetic inflow within the myocardium is probably best described by influence of the vagus nerve and spinal accessory ganglia.

== See also ==
- Right atrial pressure
- Central venous pressure
