= Venous return =

Rate of blood flow back to the heart

Venous return is the rate of blood flow back to the heart. It normally limits cardiac output.

Superposition of the cardiac function curve and venous return curve is used in one hemodynamic model.

== Physiology ==
Venous return (VR) is the flow of blood back to the heart. Under steady-state conditions, venous return must equal cardiac output (Q), when averaged over time because the cardiovascular system is essentially a closed loop. Otherwise, blood would accumulate in either the systemic or pulmonary circulations. Although cardiac output and venous return are interdependent, each can be independently regulated.

The circulatory system is made up of two circulations (pulmonary and systemic) situated in series between the right ventricle (RV) and left ventricle (LV). Balance is achieved, in large part, by the Frank–Starling mechanism. For example, if systemic venous return is suddenly increased (e.g., changing from upright to supine position), right ventricular preload increases leading to an increase in stroke volume and pulmonary blood flow. The left ventricle experiences an increase in pulmonary venous return, which in turn increases left ventricular preload and stroke volume by the Frank–Starling mechanism. In this way, an increase in venous return can lead to a matched increase in cardiac output.

=== Venous return curve ===
The horizontal axis of Guyton diagram represents right atrial pressure or central venous pressure, and the vertical axis represents cardiac output or venous return. The red curve sloping upward to the right is the cardiac output curve, and the blue curve sloping downward to the right is the venous return curve. A steady state is formed at the point where the two curves meet.

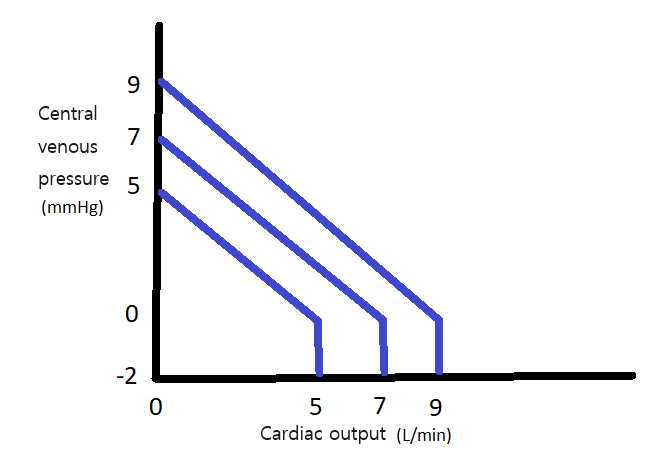
Trend of central venous pressure as a consequence of variations in cardiac output. The three functions indicate the trend in physiological conditions (in the centre), in those of decreased preload (e.g. in hemorrhage, bottom curve) and in those of increased preload (e.g. following transfusion, top curve).

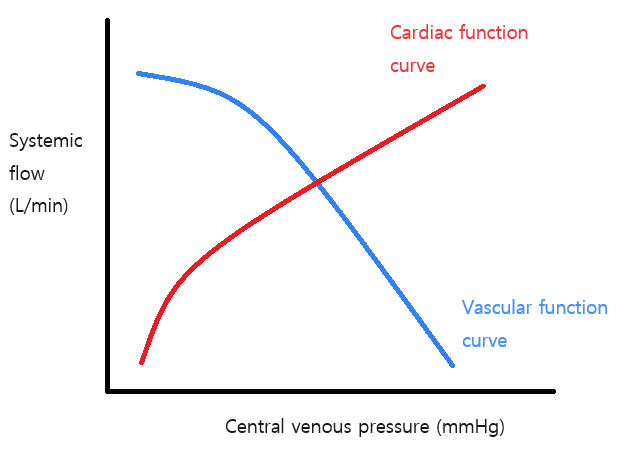
The cardiac function curve expresses how systemic flow changes as a function of the central venous pressure; it represents the Frank-Starling mechanism. The vascular function curve expresses how "central venous pressure" changes as a function of "systemic flow". Note that, for cardiac function curve, "central venous pressure" is the independent variable and "systemic flow" is the dependent variable; for vascular function curve, the opposite is true.

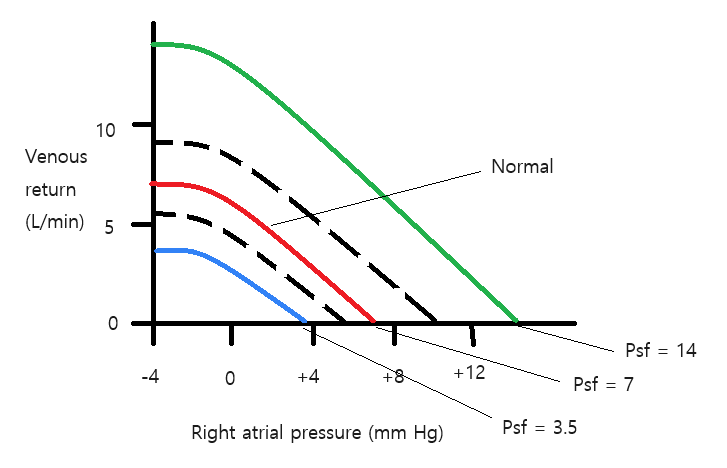
Venous return curves showing the normal curve when the mean systemic filling pressure (Psf) is 7 mm Hg and the effect of altering the Psf to 3.5, 7, or 14 mm Hg.

Hemodynamically, venous return (VR) to the heart from the venous vascular beds is determined by a pressure gradient (venous pressure - right atrial pressure) and venous resistance (RV). Therefore, increases in venous pressure or decreases in right atrial pressure or venous resistance will lead to an increase in venous return, except when changes are brought about by altered body posture. Although the above relationship is true for the hemodynamic factors that determine the flow of blood from the veins back to the heart, it is important not to lose sight of the fact that blood flow through the entire systemic circulation represents both the cardiac output and the venous return, which are equal in the steady-state because the circulatory system is closed. Therefore, one could just as well say that venous return is determined by the mean aortic pressure minus the mean right atrial pressure, divided by the resistance of the entire systemic circulation (i.e., the systemic vascular resistance).

It is often suggested that venous return dictates cardiac output, effected through the Frank Starling mechanism. However, as noted above it is clear that, equally, cardiac output must dictate venous return since over any period of time both must necessarily be equal. Similarly, the concept of mean systemic filling pressure, the hypothetical driving pressure for venous return, is difficult to localise and impossible to measure in the physiological state. Furthermore, the ohmic formulation used to describe venous return ignores the critical venous parameter of venous capacitance. It is confusion about these terms that has led some physiologists to suggest that the emphasis on 'venous return' be turned instead to more measurable and direct influences on cardiac output such as end diastolic pressure and volume which can be causally related to cardiac output and through which the influences of volume status, venous capacitance, ventricular compliance and venodilating therapies can be understood.

== Factors affecting venous return ==
1. Skeletal muscle pump: Contractions of skeletal musculature during physical activity compress capacitive vessels (including those of the abdominal cavity), promoting venous return.
2. Decreased venous capacitance: Sympathetic activation of veins decreases venous compliance, increases vasomotor tone, increases central venous pressure and promotes venous return indirectly by augmenting cardiac output through the Frank-Starling mechanism, which increases the total blood flow through the circulatory system.
3. Intrathoracic pressure: Pressure outside the heart directly affects cardiac output. Cyclical decreases and increases in intrapleural pressure (about ±2 mm Hg during normal breathing, but significantly more in certain conditions) alternately promote and hamper venous return during inspiration and expiration, respectively. Breathing against a negative pressure promotes venous returns, and breathing against a positive pressure impairs it. Opening the thoracic cage and cardiac tamponade likewise impair it.
4. Respiratory pump: During inspiration, the intrathoracic pressure is negative (suction of air into the lungs), and abdominal pressure is positive (compression of abdominal organs by diaphragm). This makes a pressure gradient between the infra- and supradiaphragmatic parts of v. cava inferior, "pulling" the blood towards the right atrium and increasing venous return.
5. Vena cava compression: An increase in the resistance of the vena cava, as occurs when the thoracic vena cava becomes compressed during a Valsalva maneuver or during late pregnancy, decreases return.
6. Gravity: The effects of gravity on venous return seem paradoxical because when a person stands up, hydrostatic forces cause the right atrial pressure to decrease and the venous pressure in the dependent limbs to increase. This increases the pressure gradient for venous return from the dependent limbs to the right atrium; however, venous return actually decreases. The reason for this is when a person initially stands, cardiac output and arterial pressure decrease (because right atrial pressure falls). The flow through the entire systemic circulation falls because arterial pressure falls more than right atrial pressure; therefore, the pressure gradient driving flow throughout the entire circulatory system is decreased.
7. Pumping action of the heart: During the cardiac cycle right atrial pressure changes alter central venous pressure (CVP), because there is no valve between the heart's atria and the large veins. CVP reflects right atrial pressure. Therefore, right atrial pressure also alters venous return.

Somewhat counterintuitively, during strenuous exercise, right atrial pressure barely changes in healthy individuals and in fact often decreases in athletic individuals who are well able to accommodate the increased throughput of the heart. Contrastingly, in individuals with impaired heart function, right atrial pressure may increase markedly even upon moderate exertion.

== See also ==
- Arthur Guyton
- Cardiac output
- Right atrial pressure
- End-diastolic volume
- Bainbridge reflex
