= Frank–Starling law =

Relationship between stroke volume and end diastolic volume

Cardiac function curve. In diagrams illustrating the Frank–Starling law of the heart, the y-axis often describes the stroke volume, stroke work, or cardiac output. The x-axis often describes end-diastolic volume, right atrial pressure, or pulmonary capillary wedge pressure. The three curves illustrate that shifts along the same line indicate a change in preload, while shifts from one line to another indicate a change in afterload or contractility. A blood volume increase would cause a shift along the line to the right, which increases left ventricular end diastolic volume (x axis), and therefore also increases stroke volume (y axis).

The Frank–Starling law of the heart (also known as Starling's law and the Frank–Starling mechanism) represents the relationship between stroke volume and end diastolic volume. The law states that the stroke volume of the heart increases in response to an increase in the volume of blood in the ventricles, before contraction (the end diastolic volume), when all other factors remain constant. As a larger volume of blood flows into the ventricle, the blood stretches cardiac muscle, leading to an increase in the force of contraction. The Frank-Starling mechanism allows the cardiac output to be synchronized with the venous return via tension of the ventricular cardiac muscle, without depending upon external regulation to make alterations. The physiological importance of the mechanism lies mainly in maintaining left and right ventricular output equality.

== Physiology ==
The Frank-Starling mechanism occurs as the result of the length-tension relationship observed in striated muscle, including for example skeletal muscles, arthropod muscle and cardiac (heart) muscle. As striated muscle is stretched, active tension is created by altering the overlap of thick and thin filaments. The greatest isometric active tension is developed when a muscle is at its optimal length. In most relaxed skeletal muscle fibers, passive elastic properties maintain the muscle fibers length near optimal, as determined usually by the fixed distance between the attachment points of tendons to the bones (or the exoskeleton of arthropods) at either end of the muscle. In contrast, the relaxed sarcomere length of cardiac muscle cells, in a resting ventricle, is lower than the optimal length for contraction. There is no bone to fix sarcomere length in the heart (of any animal) so sarcomere length is very variable and depends directly upon blood filling and thereby expanding the heart chambers. In the human heart, maximal force is generated with an initial sarcomere length of 2.2 micrometers, a length which is rarely exceeded in a normal heart. Initial lengths larger or smaller than this optimal value will decrease the force the muscle can achieve. For longer sarcomere lengths, this is the result of there being less overlap of the thin and thick filaments; for shorter sarcomere lengths, the cause is the decreased sensitivity for calcium by the myofilaments. An increase in filling of the ventricle increases the load experienced by each cardiac muscle cells, stretching their sarcomeres toward their optimal length.

One way that the stretching sarcomeres augments cardiac muscle contraction by increasing the calcium sensitivity of the myofibrils, causing a greater number of actin-myosin cross-bridges to form within the muscle. Specifically, the sensitivity of troponin for binding Ca^{2+} increases and there is an increased release of Ca^{2+} from the sarcoplasmic reticulum. In addition, stretch of cardiac myocytes increases the releasability of Ca^{2+} from the internal store, the sarcoplasmic reticulum, as shown by an increase in Ca^{2+} spark rate upon axial stretch of single cardiac myocytes. Cardiomyocytes that are stretched past their resting length are capable of generating the same force with lower concentrations of Ca2+ when compared to cardiomyocytes at rest.

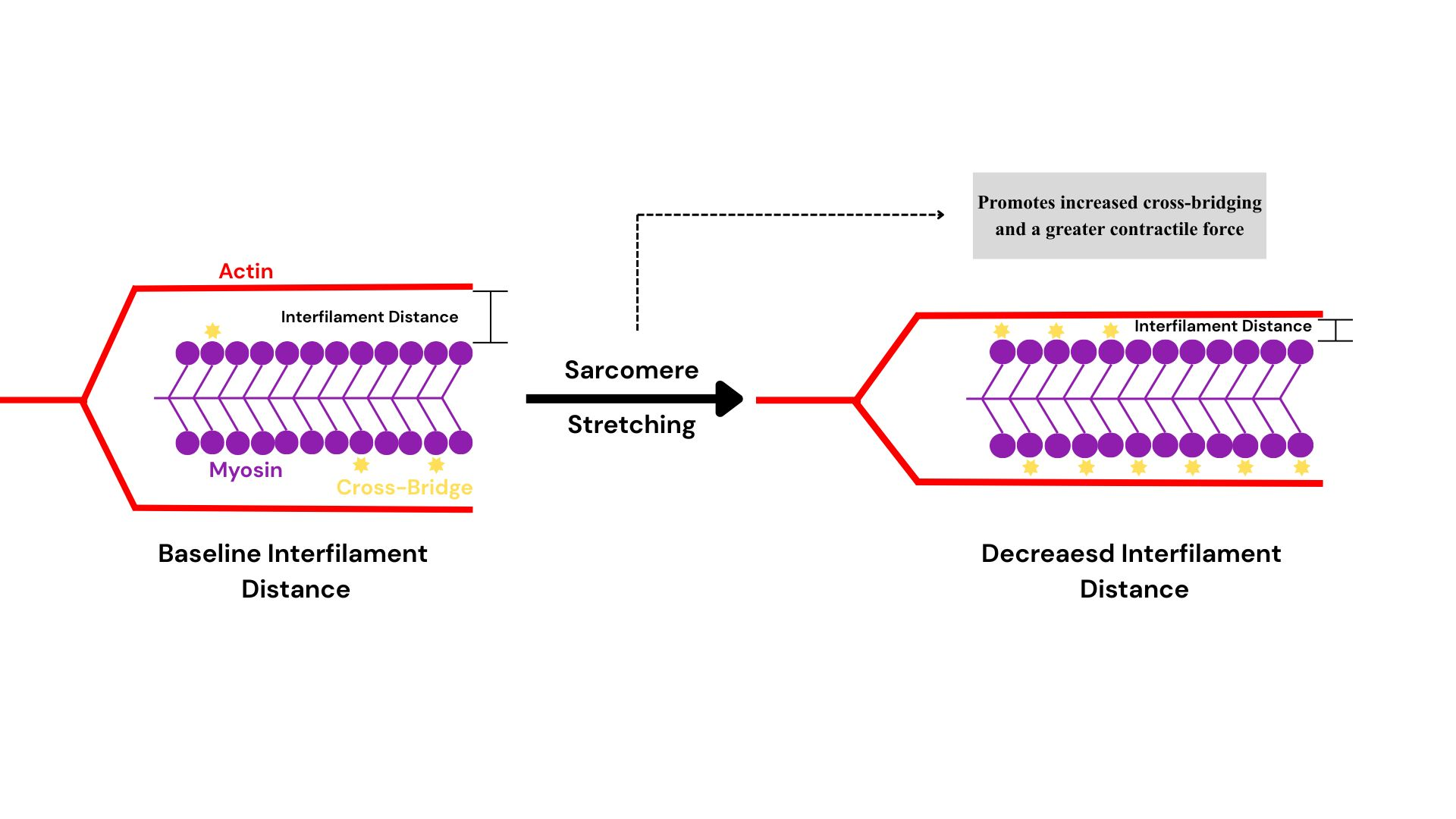
In cardiomyocytes, sarcomere stretch decreases the distance between the thin filament (actin) and the thick filament (myosin). This which leads to increased cross-bridge formation and greater tension.

Another way that the longitudinal stretching of sarcomeres augments the force generated by cardiac muscle contraction is through decreased interfilament distances. Decreased distance between thin and thick filaments allows for more cross-bridges to be formed, and the myosin heads of the thick filament collectively exert a greater force on the thin filament. When the sarcomeres in cardiac muscle are stretched, the distance between the thin filament (actin) and the thick filament (myosin) is decreased. This has been confirmed via X-ray diffraction on the cross-sectional lattice structure of striated muscle within cardiac tissue. Other biochemical pathways, including the phosphorylation of troponin I and troponin C, have been shown to decrease the interfilament distance between the thin and thick filaments as confirmed by X-ray diffraction. As the end-diastolic volume increases, there is a decrease in interfilament distance, resulting in a greater number of cross-bridges, and a subsequent greater force (pressure) generated by the ventricle.

The force that any single cardiac muscle cell generates is related to the sarcomere length at the time of muscle cell activation by calcium. The stretch on the individual cell, caused by ventricular filling, determines the sarcomere length of the fibers. Therefore the force (pressure) generated by the cardiac muscle fibres is related to the end-diastolic volume of the left and right ventricles as determined by complexities of the force-sarcomere length relationship.

Due to the intrinsic property of myocardium that is responsible for the Frank-Starling mechanism, the heart can automatically accommodate an increase in venous return, at any heart rate. The mechanism is of functional importance because it serves to adapt left ventricular output to right ventricular output. If this mechanism did not exist and the right and left cardiac outputs were not equivalent, blood would accumulate in the pulmonary circulation (were the right ventricle producing more output than the left) or the systemic circulation (were the left ventricle producing more output than the right).

== Clinical examples ==
=== Premature ventricular contraction ===
Premature ventricular contraction causes early emptying of the left ventricle (LV) into the aorta. Since the next ventricular contraction occurs at its regular time, the filling time for the LV increases, causing an increased LV end-diastolic volume. Due to the Frank–Starling mechanism, the next ventricular contraction is more forceful, leading to the ejection of the larger than normal volume of blood, and bringing the LV end-systolic volume back to baseline.

=== Diastolic dysfunction – heart failure ===
Diastolic dysfunction is associated with a reduced compliance, or increased stiffness, of the ventricle wall. This reduced compliance results in an inadequate filling of the ventricle and a decrease in the end-diastolic volume. The decreased end-diastolic volume then leads to a reduction in stroke volume because of the Frank-Starling mechanism.

== History ==
The Frank–Starling law is named after the two physiologists, Otto Frank and Ernest Henry Starling. Otto Frank published his results on experiments on frog hearts in 1895. In order to relate the work of the heart to skeletal muscle mechanics, Frank observed changes in diastolic pressure with varying volumes of the frog ventricle. His data was analyzed on a pressure-volume diagram, which resulted in his description of peak isovolumic pressure and its effects on ventricular volume.

Starling experimented on intact mammalian hearts, such as from dogs, to understand why variations in arterial pressure, heart rate, and temperature do not affect the relatively constant cardiac output. More than 30 years before the development of the sliding filament model of muscle contraction and the understanding of the relationship between active tension and sarcomere length, Starling hypothesized in 1914, "the mechanical energy set free in the passage from the resting to the active state is a function of the length of the fiber." Starling used a volume-pressure diagram to construct a length-tension diagram from his data. Starling's data and associated diagrams, provided evidence that the length of the muscle fibers, and resulting tension, altered the systolic pressure.

The first description of the relation between filling pressure and contraction pressure of the heart in the scientific literature however appears to be from 1869. Joseph Coats and Henry Pickering Bowditch found this relation on frog hearts at the Physiological Institute of Carl Ludwig in Leipzig.

Further contributions were published by the Italian physiologist Dario Maestrini, who on December 13, 1914, started the first of 19 experiments that led him to formulate the "legge del cuore" . While many renowned German and British scientisits were known for their contributions in describing the cardiac contractile response to volume, Starling's work was recognized for the synthesis of these ideas, and the establishment of a law.

The cellular mechanism underlying the Frank-Starling law remained incompletely understood until 1963, when American cardiologist Edmund Sonnenblick used quantitative electron microscopy to demonstrate that the law reflects the length-dependent overlap of thick and thin filaments within the cardiac sarcomere—directly linking the macroscopic observation that Starling had described to the sliding filament structure of cardiac muscle.

== See also ==
- Starling equation
- Total peripheral resistance
