= Pulmonary artery catheter =

Catheter for insertion into a pulmonary artery

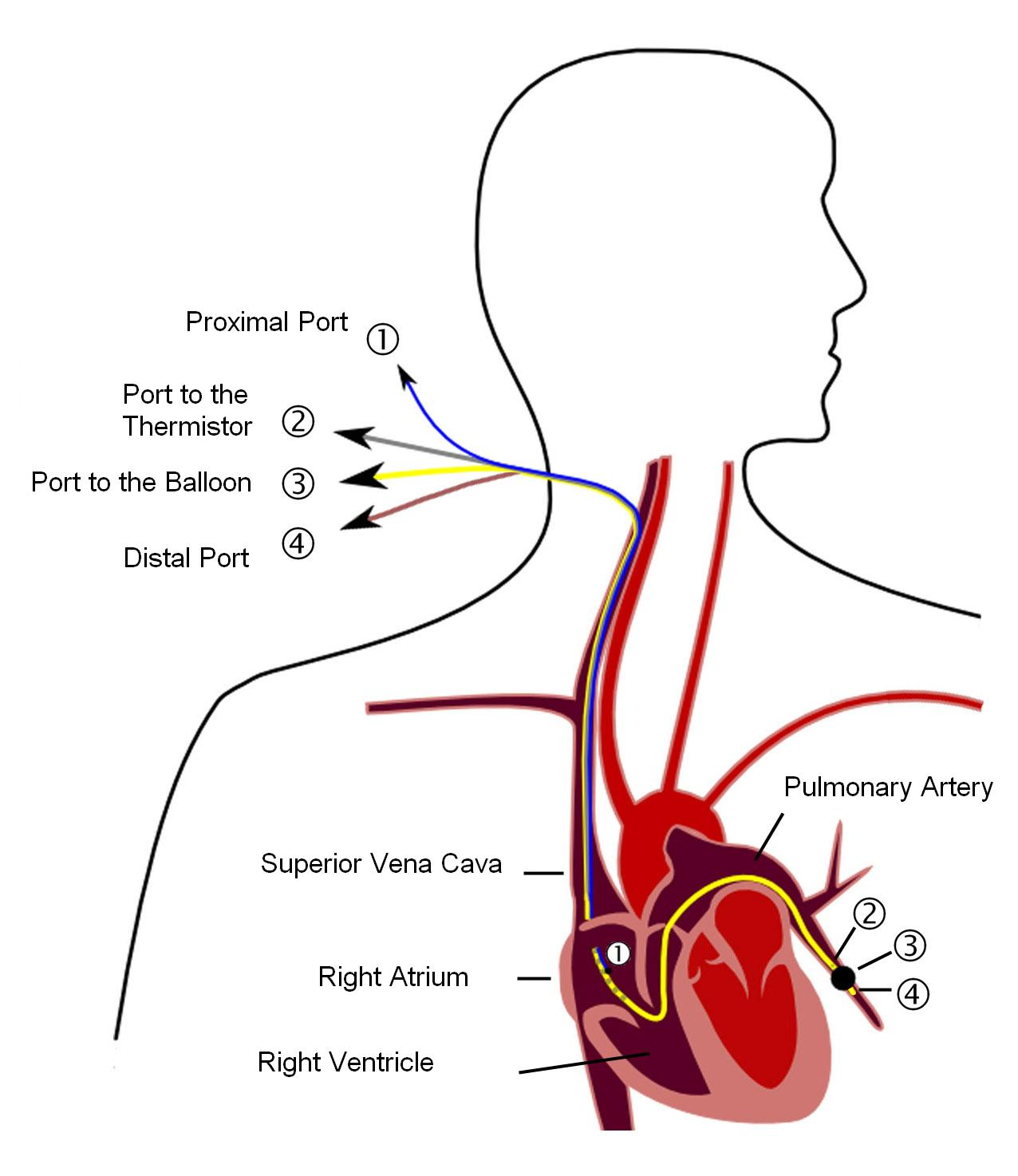
- Diagram of pulmonary artery catheter
- ICD-9-CM: 89.64
- MeSH: D002407
- eMedicine: 1824547

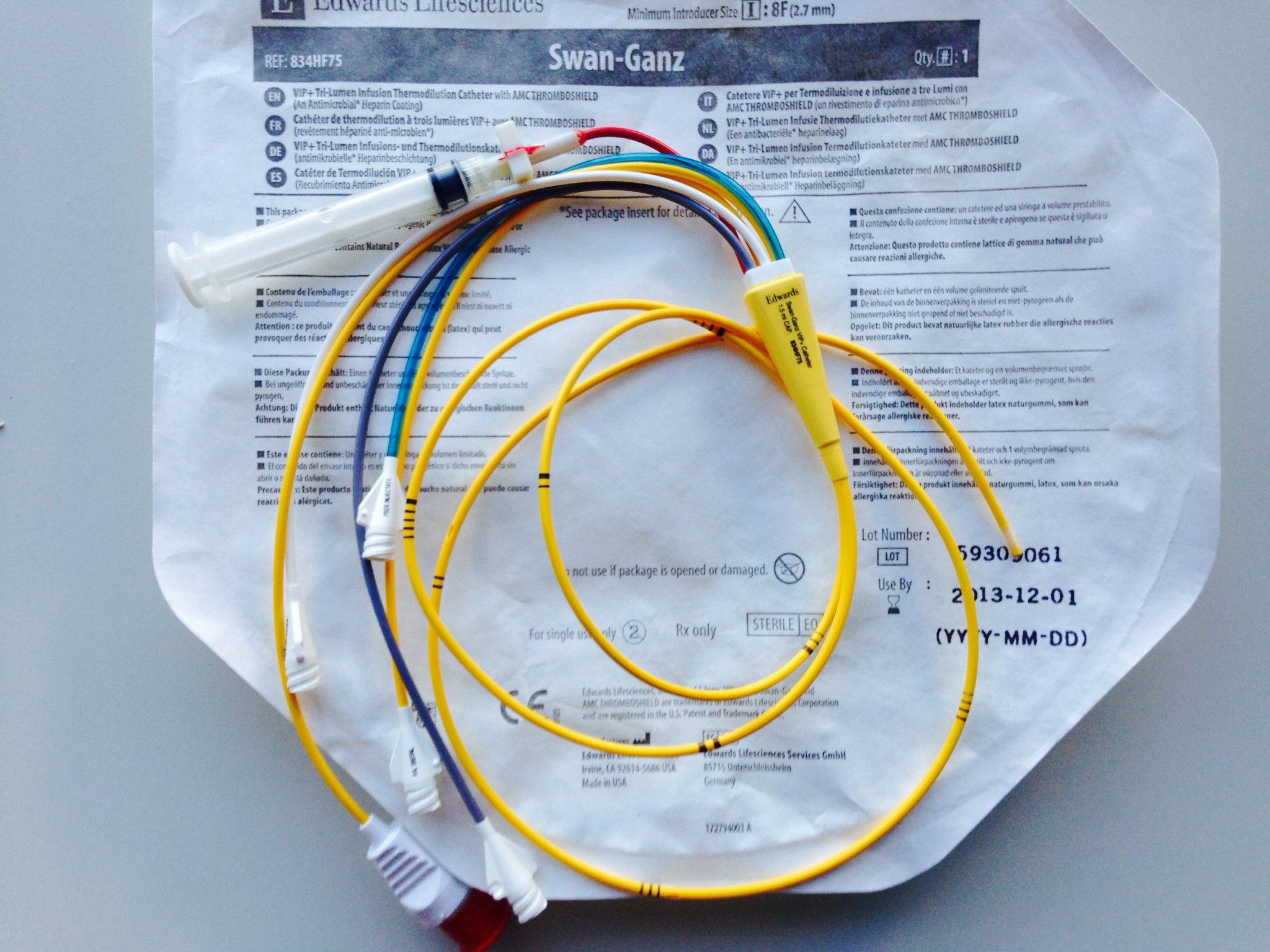
Swan sitting on its packaging

A pulmonary artery catheter (PAC), also known as a Swan-Ganz catheter, thermodilution catheter, or right heart catheter, is a balloon-tipped catheter that is inserted into a pulmonary artery in a procedure known as pulmonary artery catheterization or right heart catheterization. Pulmonary artery catheterization is a useful measure of the overall function of the heart particularly in those with complications from heart failure, heart attack, arrhythmias or pulmonary embolism. It is also a good measure for those needing intravenous fluid therapy, for instance post heart surgery, shock, and severe burns. The procedure can also be used to measure pressures in the heart chambers.

The pulmonary artery catheter allows direct, simultaneous measurement of pressures in the right atrium, right ventricle, pulmonary artery, and the filling pressure (pulmonary wedge pressure) of the left atrium. The pulmonary artery catheter is frequently referred to as a Swan-Ganz catheter, in honor of its inventors Jeremy Swan and William Ganz, from Cedars-Sinai Medical Center.

== Indications ==
General indications are:

- Management of complicated myocardial infarction
  - Hypovolemia vs cardiogenic shock
  - Ventricular septal rupture (VSR) vs acute mitral regurgitation
  - Severe left ventricular failure
  - Right ventricular infarction
  - Unstable angina
  - Refractory ventricular tachycardia
- Assessment of respiratory distress
  - Cardiogenic vs non-cardiogenic pulmonary edema
  - Primary vs secondary pulmonary hypertension
- Assessment of types of shock
- Assessment of therapy
  - Afterload reduction
  - Vasopressors
  - Beta blockers
  - Intra-aortic balloon counter-pulsation
- Assessment of fluid requirement in critically ill patients
  - Hemorrhage
  - Sepsis
  - Acute kidney injury
  - Burns
- Management of postoperative open heart surgical patients
- Assessment of valvular heart disease
- Assessment of cardiac tamponade/constriction

No study has definitively demonstrated improved outcome in critically ill patients managed with PA catheters. Given that the PA catheter is a monitoring tool and not a therapy in and of itself this is not entirely surprising. Justification for its continued use rests on a large body of clinical experience, disadvantages of other cardiac output monitoring systems, its ability to accurately measure pulmonary artery pressure, and the potential to use the catheter as a direct conduit for drug administration into the pulmonary artery.

== Procedure ==
The catheter is introduced through a large vein—often the internal jugular, subclavian, or femoral veins. Ease of placement for a pulmonary artery catheter from easiest to difficult is: right internal jugular > left subclavian > left internal jugular > right subclavian. From this entry site, it is threaded through the right atrium of the heart, the right ventricle, and subsequently into the pulmonary artery. The passage of the catheter may be monitored by dynamic pressure readings from the catheter tip or with the aid of fluoroscopy.

The standard pulmonary artery catheter has two lumens (Swan-Ganz) and is equipped with an inflatable balloon at the tip, which facilitates its placement into the pulmonary artery through the flow of blood. The balloon, when inflated, causes the catheter to "wedge" in a small pulmonary blood vessel. So wedged, the catheter can provide an indirect measurement of the pressure in the left atrium of the heart, showing a mean pressure, in addition to a, x, v, and y waves which have implications for status of the left atria and the mitral valve. Left ventricular end diastolic pressure (LVedp) is measured using a different procedure, with a catheter that has directly crossed the aortic valve and is well positioned in the left ventricle. LV edp reflects fluid status of the individual in addition to heart health. See also pulmonary wedge pressure and ventricular pressure.

== Technical developments ==
=== Thermal dilution ===
The idea for a sail or balloon tip modification of Ronald Bradley's simple portex tubing method came about from Swan's observation from the Laguna Beach CA shore of sail boats on the water on a relatively calm day. Boats with conventional slot sails were still; one with a spinnaker was able to make reasonable headway. The concept of using thermodilution to measure cardiac output was originally the idea of Arnost Fronek. As a former colleague of Fronek, Ganz added the thermistor modification after Swan showed him the initial balloon design, which was fabricated by Edwards Laboratories, which had previously contracted with Swan as a consultant.

After Swan developed the initial balloon tip, Ganz used Fronek's idea and added a small thermistor (temperature probe) about 3 cm behind the tip. 10 ml of saline (0.9% NaCl) under 10 °C or room temperature (not as accurate) is injected into an opening in the right atrium. As this cooler fluid passes the tip thermistor, a very brief drop in the blood temperature is recorded. A recent variation in design is the incorporation of a heating coil on the catheter (30 cm from the tip, residing in the atrium area) which eliminates the cold fluid bolus, a major factor in human technique variation.

By attaching both the injector site and the ventricular thermistor to a small computer, the thermodilution curve can be plotted. If details about the patient's body mass index (size); core temp, Systolic, diastolic, central venous pressure CVP (measured from the atrium by the third lumen simultaneously) and pulmonary artery pressure are input, a comprehensive flow vs pressure map can be calculated.

In crude terms, this measurement compares left and right cardiac activity and calculates preload and afterload flow and pressures which, theoretically, can be stabilized or adjusted with drugs to either constrict or dilate the vessels (to raise or lower, respectively, the pressure of blood flowing to the lungs), in order to maximize oxygen for delivery to the body tissues.

The ability to record results is not a guarantee of patient survivability.

=== Pharmacotherapy lumina ===
Modern catheters have multiple lumina — five or six are common — and have openings along the length to allow administration of inotropes and other drugs directly into the atrium. Drugs to achieve these changes can be delivered into the atrium via the fourth lumen, usually dedicated to medication. Common drugs used are various inotropes, norepinephrine or even atropine. A further set of calculations can be made by measuring the arterial blood and central venous (from the third lumen) and inputting these figures into a spreadsheet or the cardiac output computer, if so equipped, and plotting an oxygen delivery profile.

=== SvO_{2} measurement ===
One further development in recent years has been the invention of a catheter with a fiber-optic based probe which is extended and lodged into the ventricle wall providing instant readings of SvO2 or oxygen saturation of the ventricle tissues. This technique has a finite life as the sensor becomes coated with protein and it can irritate the ventricle via the contact area.

=== Alternatives ===
Various other techniques have largely relegated the PA catheter to history, e.g. the lithium dilution technique; the external bio-resistance monitor, pulse contour analysis or the very simple and reliable technique of esophogeal doppler measurements of the descending aorta.

== Complications ==
The procedure is not without risk, and complications can be life-threatening. It can lead to arrhythmias, pseudoaneurysm formation or rupture of the pulmonary artery, thrombosis, infection, pneumothorax, bleeding, and other problems.

== Controversy ==
The benefit of the use of this type of catheter has been controversial. Therefore, many clinicians minimize its use.

=== Evidence of benefit ===
Several studies in the 1980s seemed to show a benefit of the increase in physiological information. Many reports showing benefit of the PA catheter are from anaesthetic, and Intensive Care Unit (ICU) settings. In these settings cardiovascular performance was optimized thinking patients would have supra-normal metabolic requirements. In 2005, a multi-center randomized controlled trial found no difference in mortality or length of stay in ICU patients who received pulmonary artery catheters, though it did find a 10% incidence of complications related to the procedure.

=== Evidence of harm or lack of benefit ===
Contrary to earlier studies there is growing evidence the use of a PA catheter (PAC) does not necessarily lead to improved outcome. One explanation could be that nurses and physicians are insufficiently knowledgeable to adequately interpret the PA catheter measurements. Also, the benefits might be reduced by the complications from the use of the PAC. Furthermore, using information from the PAC might result in a more aggressive therapy causing the detrimental effect. Or, it could give rise to more harmful therapies (i.e. achieving supra-normal values could be associated with increased mortality).

=== Utility of pulmonary artery catheterization ===
This interpretation of Adolph Ficks' formulation for cardiac output by time/temperature curves is an expedient but limited and invasive model of right heart performance. It remains an exceptional method of monitoring volume overload leading to pulmonary edema in an ICU setting.

A feature of the pulmonary artery catheter that has been largely ignored in the clinical setting is its ability to monitor total body oxygen extraction by measuring the mixed venous oxygen saturation. Regardless of the value obtained by measurements of the cardiac output, the mixed venous oxygen saturation is an accurate parameter of total body blood flow and therefore cardiac output. The assumption that a low mixed venous oxygen saturation (normal = 60% except for the coronary sinus where it approximates 40% reflecting the high metabolic rate of the myocardium) represents less than adequate oxygen delivery is consistent with physiological and metabolic observations. High oxygen extraction is associated with low cardiac output and decreased mixed venous oxygen saturation. Except during hypothermia and in severe sepsis, low mixed venous oxygen saturations are indication of inadequate hemodynamics. The ability of the pulmonary artery catheter to sample mixed venous blood is of great utility to manage low cardiac output states.

Non-invasive echocardiography and pulse-wave cardiac output monitoring are concordant with (and much safer) if not better than invasive methods defining right and left heart performance. The emergence of MRSA and similar hospital based catheter infections now clearly limits the utility of this type of invasive cardiac ICU intervention.
