= Passive leg raise =

Medical diagnostic method and treatment

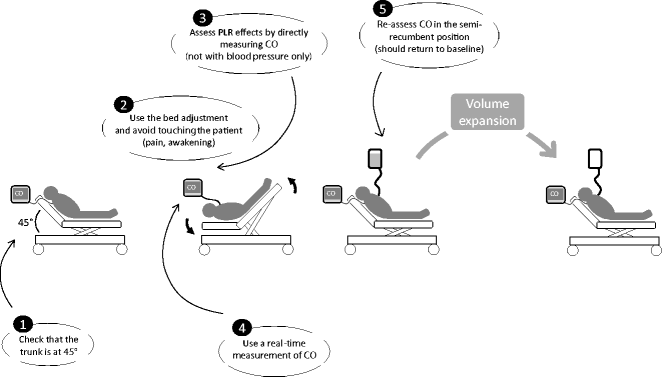
- passive leg raising test
- Synonyms: Shock position

Passive leg raise, also known as shock position, is a treatment for shock or a test used to predict the response to rapid fluid loading during fluid resuscitation.

In passive leg raise, a person lies flat on their back with their legs elevated 8–12 inches (200–300 mm). This is done to keep the legs above the heart, helping blood flow to the heart through gravity. This increases the volume of blood available to the heart (cardiac preload) by 150–300 milliliters. The real-time effects of this on parameters such as blood pressure and heart rate can assist medical professionals.

In a clinical setting, a patient's bed may be moved from a semi-recumbent position (half sitting, half lying down) to a recumbent position (lying down) with the legs raised. This is theorized to cause additional mobilization of blood from the gastrointestinal circulation.

The assessment of fluid loading is easier with invasive monitoring (such as an arterial catheter). The monitoring provides real-time measurements of cardiac output, which helps monitor changes in blood pressure or pulse during this procedure. Cardiac output can be measured by arterial pulse contour analysis, echocardiography, esophageal Doppler, or contour analysis of the volume clamp-derived arterial pressure. Any bronchial secretions must be aspirated before performing this test.

The legs should not be manually elevated because doing so may provoke pain, discomfort, or awakening, leading to adrenergic stimulation and falsely elevated cardiac output readings by increasing heart rate. After the maneuver, the bed should be returned to the semi-recumbent position, and cardiac output should be measured again. The cardiac output should return to the values measured before this maneuver was initiated. This test can be used to assess fluid responsiveness without any fluid challenge, which can lead to fluid overload. Compression stockings should be removed before the test so that an adequate volume of blood will return to the heart during the maneuver. The physiology of assessing fluid responsiveness via passive leg raise requires increasing systemic venous return without altering cardiac function—a form of functional hemodynamic monitoring.

Several studies have shown that this measure is a better predictor of response to rapid fluid loading than other tests, such as respiratory variation in pulse pressure or echocardiographic markers.

Placing the person in the Trendelenburg position does not work because blood vessels are highly compliant and expand as a result of the increased volume locally. A more suitable option would be the use of vasopressors.

== See also ==
- Trendelenburg position
