= Sulmazole =

Chemical compound

Identifiers
- IUPAC name: 2-(2-Methoxy-4-methylsulfinylphenyl)-1H-imidazo[4,5-b]pyridine
- CAS Number: 73384-60-8
- PubChem CID: 5353
- UNII: HK56EH9K44
- CompTox Dashboard (EPA): DTXSID1040617
- ECHA InfoCard: 100.070.348

Chemical and physical data
- Formula: C_{14}H_{13}N_{3}O_{2}S
- Molar mass: 287.34 g·mol^{−1}
- 3D model (JSmol): Interactive image
- SMILES: COC1=C(C=CC(=C1)S(=O)C)C2=NC3=C(N2)C=CC=N3

Sulmazole is a cardiotonic drug. Sulmazole has the chemical formula C_{14}H_{13}N_{3}O_{2}S and a molecular weight of 287.34 g/mol.

Sulmazole has been shown to improve cardiac index and reduce pulmonary capillary wedge pressure without significant changes in a person's heart rate or arterial pressure. Sulmazole inhibits the A1 adenosine receptor and functionally blocks Gi, an inhibitory regulator. Sulmazole is also a phosphodiesterase inhibitor. Sulmazole is classified as an imidazopyridine and a sulfoxide. Sulmazole can be taken intravenously or orally. Side effects from sulmazole include blurring vision and temporary color blindness.
