= Afterload =

Pressure in the wall of the left ventricle during ejection

Ventricular systole. Red arrow is path from left ventricle to aorta. Afterload is largely dependent upon aortic pressure.

Afterload is the pressure that the heart must work against to eject blood during systole (ventricular contraction). Afterload is proportional to the average arterial pressure. As aortic and pulmonary pressures increase, the afterload increases on the left and right ventricles respectively. Afterload changes to adapt to the continually changing demands on an animal's cardiovascular system. Afterload is proportional to mean systolic blood pressure and is measured in millimeters of mercury (mm Hg).

The clinical concept of afterload was given its modern operational definitions through the work of American cardiologist Edmund Sonnenblick and colleagues at the National Institutes of Health in the early 1960s. Sonnenblick's force-velocity studies of isolated cardiac muscle demonstrated that afterload directly determines the velocity of myocardial fiber shortening, providing the theoretical basis for afterload reduction as a therapeutic strategy in heart failure.

== Hemodynamics ==
Afterload is a determinant of cardiac output. Cardiac output is the product of stroke volume and heart rate. Afterload is a determinant of stroke volume (in addition to preload, and strength of myocardial contraction).

Following Laplace's law, the tension upon the muscle fibers in the heart wall is the pressure within the ventricle multiplied by the volume within the ventricle divided by the wall thickness (this ratio is the other factor in setting the afterload). Therefore, when comparing a normal heart to a heart with a dilated left ventricle, if the aortic pressure is the same in both hearts, the dilated heart must create a greater tension to overcome the same aortic pressure to eject blood because it has a larger internal radius and volume. Thus, the dilated heart has a greater total load (tension) on the myocytes, i.e., has a higher afterload. This is also true in the eccentric hypertrophy consequent to high-intensity aerobic training. Conversely, a concentrically hypertrophied left ventricle may have a lower afterload for a given aortic pressure. When contractility becomes impaired and the ventricle dilates, the afterload rises and limits output. This may start a vicious circle, in which cardiac output is reduced as oxygen requirements are increased.

Afterload can also be described as the pressure that the chambers of the heart must generate to eject blood from the heart, and this is a consequence of aortic pressure (for the left ventricle) and pulmonic pressure or pulmonary artery pressure (for the right ventricle). The pressure in the ventricles must be greater than the systemic and pulmonary pressure to open the aortic and pulmonic valves, respectively. As afterload increases, cardiac output decreases. Cardiac imaging is a somewhat limited modality in defining afterload because it depends on the interpretation of volumetric data.

== Calculating afterload ==
Quantitatively, afterload can be calculated by determining the wall stress of the left ventricle, using the Young–Laplace equation:

$\left ( \frac{EDP \cdot EDR}{2h} \right )$ where

EDP is end-diastolic pressure in the left ventricle, which is typically approximated by taking pulmonary artery wedge pressure,

EDR is end-diastolic radius at the midpoint of the left ventricle, and

h is the mean thickness of the left ventricle wall. Both radius and mean thickness of the left ventricle may be measured by echocardiography.

== Factors affecting afterload ==
Disease processes pathology that include indicators such as an increasing left ventricular afterload include elevated blood pressure and aortic valve disease.

Systolic hypertension (HTN) (elevated blood pressure) increases the left ventricular (LV) afterload because the LV must work harder to eject blood into the aorta. This is because the aortic valve won't open until the pressure generated in the left ventricle is higher than the elevated blood pressure in the aorta.

Pulmonary hypertension (PH) is increased blood pressure within the right heart leading to the lungs. PH indicates a regionally applied increase in afterload dedicated to the right side of the heart, divided and isolated from the left heart by the interventricular septum.

In the natural aging process, aortic stenosis often increases afterload because the left ventricle must overcome the pressure gradient caused by the calcified and stenotic aortic valve, in addition to the blood pressure required to eject blood into the aorta. For instance, if the blood pressure is 120/80, and the aortic valve stenosis creates a trans-valvular gradient of 30 mmHg, the left ventricle has to generate a pressure of 110 mmHg to open the aortic valve and eject blood into the aorta.

Due to the increased afterload, the ventricle has to work harder to accomplish its goal of ejecting blood into the aorta. Thus, in the long-term, increased afterload (due to the stenosis) results in hypertrophy of the left ventricle to account for the increased work required and also to decrease wall stress since wall thickness and wall stress are inversely proportional.

Aortic insufficiency (Aortic Regurgitation) increases afterload, because a percentage of the blood that ejects forward regurgitates back through the diseased aortic valve. This leads to elevated systolic blood pressure. The diastolic blood pressure in the aorta falls, due to regurgitation. This increases pulse pressure.

Mitral regurgitation (MR) decreases afterload. In ventricular systole under MR, regurgitant blood flows backwards/retrograde back and forth through a diseased and leaking mitral valve. The remaining blood loaded into the LV is then optimally ejected out through the aortic valve. With an extra pathway for blood flow through the mitral valve, the left ventricle does not have to work as hard to eject its blood, i.e. there is a decreased afterload. Afterload is largely dependent upon aortic pressure.

== See also ==
- Cardiac output
- Hemodynamics
- Preload
