= Right atrial pressure =

Right atrial pressure (RAP) is the blood pressure in the right atrium of the heart. RAP reflects the amount of blood returning to the heart and the ability of the heart to pump the blood into the arterial system. RAP is often nearly identical to central venous pressure (CVP), although the two terms are not identical, as a pressure differential can sometimes exist between the venae cavae and the right atrium. CVP and RAP can differ when venous tone (i.e the degree of venous constriction) is altered. This can be graphically depicted as changes in the slope of the venous return (VR) plotted against right atrial pressure (where central venous pressure (CVP) increases, but right atrial pressure (RAP) stays the same; VR = CVP − RAP).

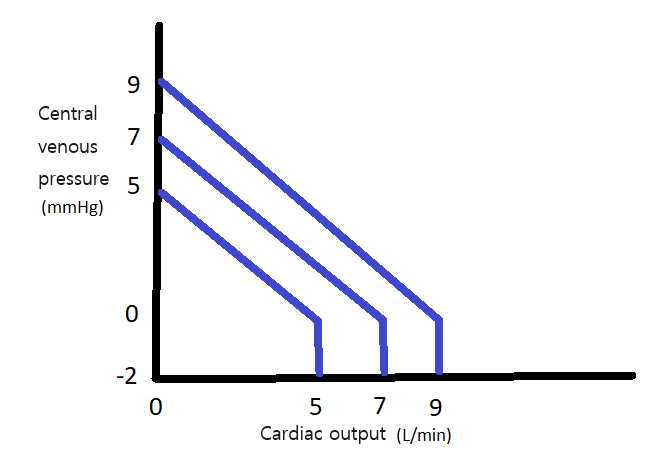
Trend of central venous pressure as a consequence of variations in cardiac output. The three functions indicate the trend in physiological conditions (in the centre), in those of decreased preload (e.g. in hemorrhage, bottom curve) and in those of increased preload (e.g. following transfusion, top curve).

== Factors affecting RAP ==
Factors that increase RAP include:

- Hypervolemia
- Forced exhalation
- Tension pneumothorax
- Heart failure
- Pleural effusion
- Decreased cardiac output
- Cardiac tamponade
- Mechanical ventilation and the application of positive end-expiratory pressure (PEEP)
- Pulmonary Hypertension
- Pulmonary Embolism
- Left to right shunted Atrial Septal Defect

Factors that decrease RAP include:

- Hypovolemia
- Deep inhalation
- Distributive shock

== See also ==
- Pulmonary capillary wedge pressure
- Jugular venous pressure
- Central venous pressure
