= Central venous pressure =

Blood pressure in vein near the heart

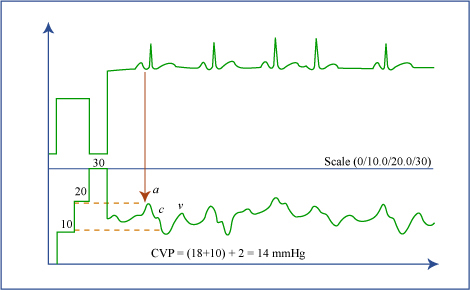
Central venous pressure monitoring results.

Central venous pressure (CVP) is the blood pressure in the venae cavae, near the right atrium of the heart. CVP reflects the amount of blood returning to the heart and the ability of the heart to pump the blood back into the arterial system. CVP is often a good approximation of right atrial pressure (RAP), although the two terms are not identical, as a pressure differential can sometimes exist between the venae cavae and the right atrium. CVP and RAP can differ when arterial tone is altered. This can be graphically depicted as changes in the slope of the venous return (VR) plotted against right atrial pressure (where central venous pressure (CVP) increases, but right atrial pressure (RAP) stays the same; VR = CVP − RAP).

CVP has been, and often still is, used as a surrogate for preload, and changes in CVP in response to infusions of intravenous fluid have been used to predict volume-responsiveness (i.e. whether more fluid will improve cardiac output). However, there is increasing evidence that CVP, whether as an absolute value or in terms of changes in response to fluid, does not correlate with ventricular volume (i.e. preload) or volume-responsiveness, and so should not be used to guide intravenous fluid therapy. Nevertheless, CVP monitoring is a useful tool to guide hemodynamic therapy. The cardiopulmonary baroreflex responds to an increase in CVP by decreasing systemic vascular resistance while increasing heart rate and ventricular contractility in dogs.

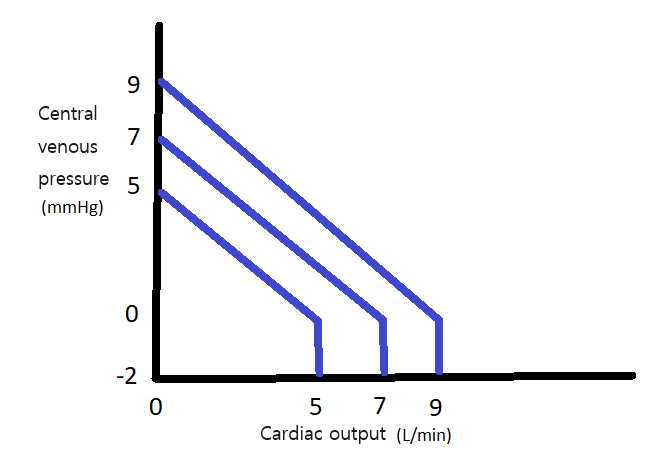
Trend of central venous pressure as a consequence of variations in cardiac output. The three functions indicate the trend in physiological conditions (in the centre), in those of decreased preload (e.g. in hemorrhage, bottom curve) and in those of increased preload (e.g. following transfusion, top curve).

== Measurement ==
Site		Normal pressure range (in mmHg)
Central venous pressure		3–8
Right ventricular pressure	systolic	15–30
Right ventricular pressure	diastolic	3–8
Pulmonary artery pressure	systolic	15–30
Pulmonary artery pressure	diastolic	4–12
Pulmonary vein/ Pulmonary capillary wedge pressure		2–15
Left ventricular pressure	systolic	100–140
Left ventricular pressure	diastolic	3–12

Normal CVP in patients can be measured from two points of reference:

- Sternum: 0–14 cm H_{2}O
- Midaxillary line: 8–15 cm H_{2}O

CVP can be measured by connecting the patient's central venous catheter to a special infusion set which is connected to a small diameter water column. If the water column is calibrated properly the height of the column indicates the CVP.

In most intensive care units, facilities are available to measure CVP continuously.

Normal values vary between 4 and 12 cm H_{2}O.

== Factors affecting CVP ==
Factors that increase CVP include:

- Cardiac tamponade
- Decreased cardiac output
- Forced exhalation
- Heart failure
- Hypervolemia
- Mechanical ventilation and the application of positive end-expiratory pressure (PEEP)
- Pleural effusion
- Pulmonary embolism
- Pulmonary hypertension
- Tension pneumothorax

Factors that decrease CVP include:

- Deep inhalation
- Distributive shock
- Hypovolemia

== See also ==
- Jugular venous pressure
- Pulmonary capillary wedge pressure
