= Aortic pressure =

Blood pressure at the root of aorta

Central aortic pressure (CAP), central aortic blood pressure (CABP), or central aortic systolic pressure (CASP) is the blood pressure at the root of aorta. Studies have shown the importance of central aortic pressure, especially as compared to peripheral blood pressure, and its implications in assessing the efficacy of antihypertensive treatment with respect to cardiovascular risk factors, kidney disease, and mortality. There is an emerging movement for clinicians to begin using central aortic blood pressure, instead of peripheral blood pressure, as a guide for clinical decisions.

== Measurement ==
In the past, central aortic blood pressure could only be measured by invasive means, such as heart catheterization, but there now exist, or are in late stages of development, noninvasive methods of accurately measuring it indirectly.

== Relationship to disease ==
Elevated central aortic blood pressure has generally been found to be a greater predictor of cardiovascular disease-related mortality, structural changes in the heart, and chronic kidney disease than elevated peripheral blood pressure (such as measured in the brachial artery, the main artery in the upper arm where blood pressure is most commonly measured).

Different medications for lowering blood pressure have different effects on the central aortic pressure and blood flow characteristics, despite producing similar peripheral blood pressure readings. The traditional method of measuring blood pressure in peripheral arteries, such as the brachial artery (the main artery in the upper arm) has been shown to underestimate the efficacy of medications such as amlodipine (a calcium channel blocker) and overestimate the efficacy of those like atenolol (a beta blocker).

Central aortic blood pressure is a better independent predictor of negative cardiovascular (such as heart attack or stroke) and kidney (such as chronic kidney disease) outcomes than is peripheral blood pressure.
