= Esophageal doppler =

In medicine, Esophageal Doppler or Oesophageal Doppler uses a small ultrasound probe inserted into the esophagus through the nose or mouth to measure blood velocity in the descending aorta. It is minimally invasive (does not break the skin) and is used to derive hemodynamic parameters such as stroke volume (SV) and cardiac output (CO). A properly constructed and calibrated probe is approved for use on adults and children in many parts of the world.

== How it Works ==
From the probe tip, a beam of continuous wave ultrasound is directed through the esophageal wall into the aorta and reflects off the moving blood back to the probe; the Doppler effect is used to directly measure the velocity of the blood (by the shift in frequency of the reflected ultrasound signal compared to the original beam).

== Esophageal Doppler Monitor ==
An Esophageal Doppler Monitor (EDM) or Oesophageal Doppler Monitor (ODM) is a cardiac output monitor using an esophageal positioned ultrasound sensor. It usually displays a graph of real-time aortic blood velocities and recognized main flow against time. It provides instantaneous values of hemodynamic parameters for the just past beat, such as heart rate (HR), stroke distance (SD), maximum acceleration (MA), flow-time (FT) and peak velocity (PV); also values calculated from these, such as stroke volume (SV), flow-time corrected (FTc) and cardiac output (CO). Using manual input of age, weight and height; body surface area (BSA) and body mass index (BMI) estimates are calculated, so that indexed values may be calculated and displayed, such as cardiac output index (CI) and stroke volume index (SVI or SI). Often available is recording of instantaneous values and display of a long-term trend graph.

== Instantaneous Values ==
In an Esophageal Doppler Monitor (EDM) or Oesophageal Doppler Monitor (ODM), during the time the aortic valve is open (ejection time or flow time), the average aortic blood velocity is calculated. The product of average velocity and ejection time gives the stroke distance (how far the blood travels in each heart cycle). Flow time (FT) is the time difference between the sudden increase in velocity (T0) and the return to near zero velocity (T1). Stroke distance (SD) can calculated from the plug flow like velocity (v(t)):

$$SD = \int_{T0}^{T1} v(t)\,dt$$.

An estimate of the aortic cross-sectional area is calculated from a function of age, weight and height. The cross-sectional area is adjusted to give more accurate cardiac output and renamed to aortic constant (AC).

The product of stroke distance and aortic constant gives stroke volume (how much blood was ejected from a heartbeat into the arteries).

The heart rate (HR) can be calculated from the time difference between the current peak velocity and the previous one.

Cardiac output (CO) is the product of stroke volume and heart rate. Although CO is available beat by beat, it is usually averaged over a number of beats (typically 5) to reduce the variation in displayed value.

== Parameters ==
The Doppler frequency shift signal is processed to produce a list of signal power against frequency samples, 180 times a second. This list is analysed to identify the velocities of the plug flow like movement down the centre of the aorta. The plug flow velocities can be differentiated and integrated against time to derive acceleration, peak velocity and stroke distance. With an aortic constant based on age, weight and height; stroke volume (SV) is calculated.

| Parameter | Definition |
|---|---|
| Heart rate | Number of heart beats each minute |
| Cardiac output | Amount of blood pumped by the left ventricle each minute |
| Cardiac index | Cardiac output normalized for body surface area |
| Stroke volume | Amount of blood pumped by the left ventricle each heartbeat |
| Stroke volume variation | Variation of Stroke Volume beat to beat |
| Stroke index | Stroke volume normalized for body surface area |
| Stroke distance | How far the blood is pumped by the left ventricle each heartbeat |
| Maximum acceleration | Index of contractility. Peak acceleration of blood flow in the aorta |
| Flow time | The time interval from the opening to the closing of the aortic valve |
| Flow time corrected | The flow time adjusted to a heart rate of 60 beats per minute |
