= Cardiac output =

Measurement of blood pumped by the heart

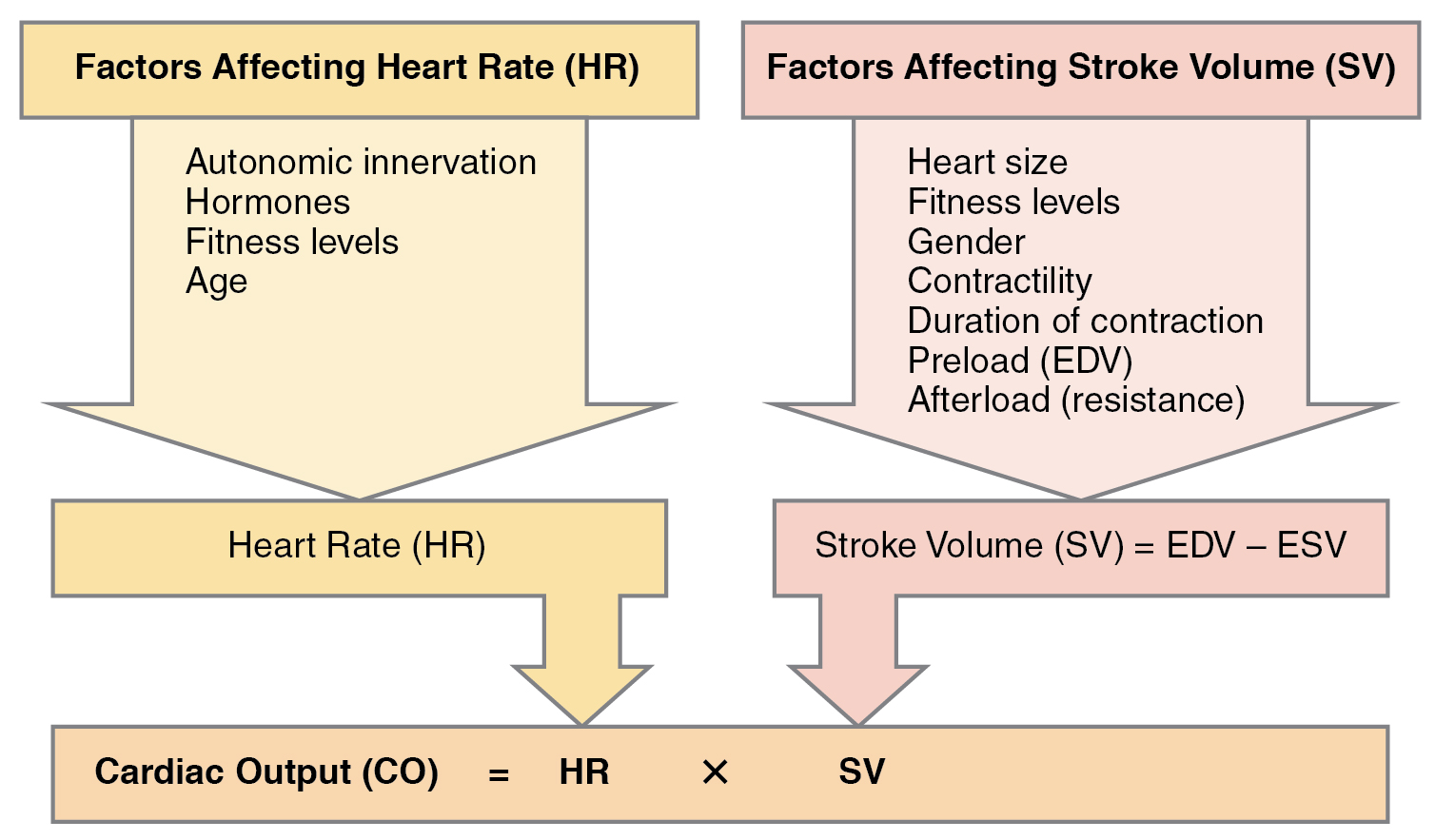
Major factors influencing cardiac output – heart rate and stroke volume, both of which are variable.

In cardiac physiology, cardiac output (CO), also known as heart output and often denoted by the symbols $Q$, $\dot Q$, or $\dot Q_{c}$, is the volumetric flow rate of the heart's pumping output: that is, the volume of blood being pumped by a single ventricle of the heart, per unit time (usually measured per minute). Cardiac output (CO) is the product of the heart rate (HR), i.e. the number of heartbeats per minute (bpm), and the stroke volume (SV), which is the volume of blood pumped from the left ventricle per beat; thus giving the formula:

$CO = HR \times SV$

Values for cardiac output are usually denoted as L/min. For a healthy individual weighing 70 kg, the cardiac output at rest averages about 5 L/min; assuming a heart rate of 70 beats/min, the stroke volume would be approximately 70 mL.

Because cardiac output is related to the quantity of blood delivered to various parts of the body, it is an important component of how efficiently the heart can meet the body's demands for the maintenance of adequate tissue perfusion. Body tissues require continuous oxygen delivery which requires the sustained transport of oxygen to the tissues by systemic circulation of oxygenated blood at an adequate pressure from the left ventricle of the heart via the aorta and arteries. Oxygen delivery (DO_{2} mL/min) is the resultant of blood flow (cardiac output CO) times the blood oxygen content (CaO_{2}). Mathematically this is calculated as follows: oxygen delivery = cardiac output × arterial oxygen content, giving the formula:

$D_{O2} = CO \times C_aO2$

With a resting cardiac output of 5 L/min, a 'normal' oxygen delivery is around 1 L/min. The amount/percentage of the circulated oxygen consumed (VO_{2}) per minute through metabolism varies depending on the activity level but at rest is circa 25% of the DO_{2}. Physical exercise requires a higher than resting-level of oxygen consumption to support increased muscle activity. Regular aerobic exercise can induce physiological adaptations such as improved stroke volume and myocardial efficiency that increase cardiac output. In the case of heart failure, actual CO may be insufficient to support even simple activities of daily living; nor can it increase sufficiently to meet the higher metabolic demands stemming from even moderate exercise.

Cardiac output is a global blood flow parameter of interest in hemodynamics, the study of the flow of blood. The factors affecting stroke volume and heart rate also affect cardiac output. The figure at the right margin illustrates this dependency and lists some of these factors. A detailed hierarchical illustration is provided in a subsequent figure.

There are many methods of measuring CO, both invasively and non-invasively; each has advantages and drawbacks as described below.

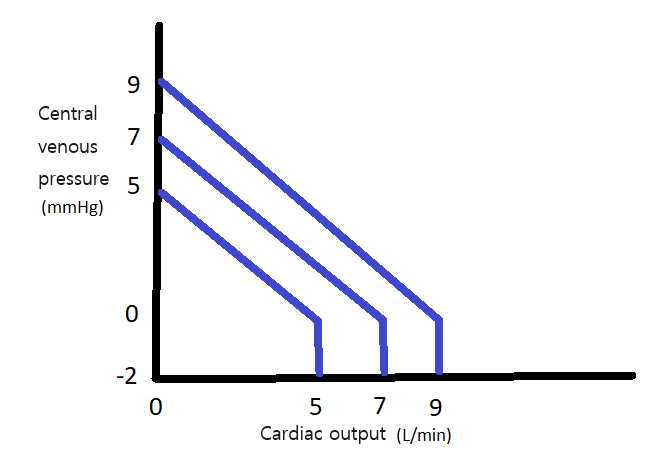
Trend of central venous pressure as a consequence of variations in cardiac output. The three functions indicate the trend in physiological conditions (in the centre), in those of decreased preload (e.g. in hemorrhage, bottom curve) and in those of increased preload (e.g. following transfusion, top curve).

== Definition ==
The function of the heart is to drive blood through the circulatory system in a cycle that delivers oxygen, nutrients and chemicals to the body's cells and removes cellular waste. Because it pumps out whatever blood comes back into it from the venous system, the quantity of blood returning to the heart effectively determines the quantity of blood the heart pumps out – its cardiac output, Q. Cardiac output is classically defined alongside stroke volume (SV) and the heart rate (HR) as:

$CO_\text{[L/min]} = SV_\text{[L/beat]} \times HR_\text{[beats/min]}$	1

In standardizing what CO values are considered to be within normal range independent of the size of the subject's body, the accepted convention is to further index equation (1) using body surface area (BSA), giving rise to the Cardiac index (CI). This is detailed in equation (2) below.

== Measurement ==
There are a number of clinical methods to measure cardiac output, ranging from direct intracardiac catheterization to non-invasive measurement of the arterial pulse. Each method has advantages and drawbacks. Relative comparison is limited by the absence of a widely accepted "gold standard" measurement. Cardiac output can also be affected significantly by the phase of respiration – intra-thoracic pressure changes influence diastolic filling and therefore cardiac output. This is especially important during mechanical ventilation, in which cardiac output can vary by up to 50% across a single respiratory cycle. Cardiac output should therefore be measured at evenly spaced points over a single cycle or averaged over several cycles.

Invasive methods are well accepted, but there is increasing evidence that these methods are neither accurate nor effective in guiding therapy. Consequently, the focus on development of non-invasive methods is growing.

=== Doppler ultrasound ===
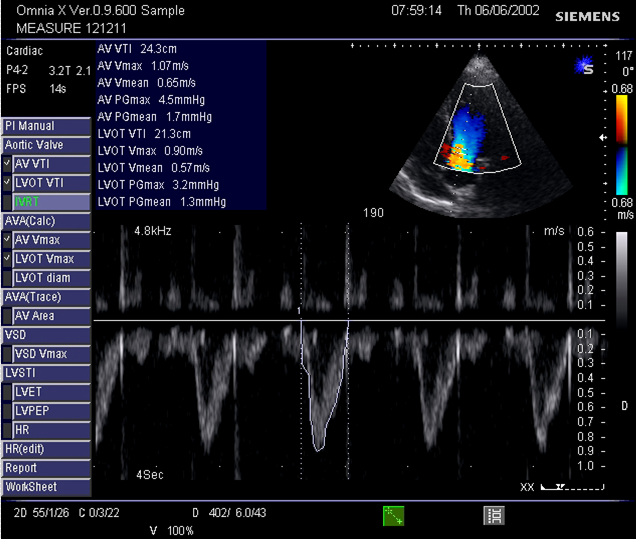
Doppler signal in the left ventricular outflow tract: Velocity Time Integral (VTI)

This method uses ultrasound and the Doppler effect to measure cardiac output. The blood velocity through the heart causes a Doppler shift in the frequency of the returning ultrasound waves. This shift can then be used to calculate flow velocity and volume, and effectively cardiac output, using the following equations:

- $Q = SV \times HR$
- $SV = VTI \times CSA$
- $CSA = \pi r^2$

where:

- CSA is the valve orifice cross sectional area,
- r is the valve radius, and,
- VTI is the velocity time integral of the trace of the Doppler flow profile.

Being non-invasive, accurate and inexpensive, Doppler ultrasound is a routine part of clinical ultrasound; it has high levels of reliability and reproducibility, and has been in clinical use since the 1960s.

==== Echocardiography ====
Echocardiography is a non-invasive method of quantifying cardiac output using ultrasound. Two-dimensional (2D) ultrasound and Doppler measurements are used together to calculate cardiac output. 2D measurement of the diameter (d) of the aortic annulus allows calculation of the flow cross-sectional area (CSA), which is then multiplied by the VTI of the Doppler flow profile across the aortic valve to determine the flow volume per beat (stroke volume, SV). The result is then multiplied by the heart rate (HR) to obtain cardiac output. Although used in clinical medicine, it has a wide test-retest variability. It is said to require extensive training and skill, but the exact steps needed to achieve clinically adequate precision have never been disclosed. 2D measurement of the aortic valve diameter is one source of noise; others are beat-to-beat variation in stroke volume and subtle differences in probe position. An alternative that is not necessarily more reproducible is the measurement of the pulmonary valve to calculate right-sided CO. Although it is in wide general use, the technique is time-consuming and is limited by the reproducibility of its component elements. In the manner used in clinical practice, precision of SV and CO is of the order of ±20%.

==== Transcutaneous ====
Ultrasonic Cardiac Output Monitor (USCOM) uses continuous wave Doppler to measure the Doppler flow profile VTI. It uses anthropometry to calculate aortic and pulmonary valve diameters and CSAs, allowing right-sided and left-sided Q measurements. In comparison to the echocardiographic method, USCOM significantly improves reproducibility and increases sensitivity of the detection of changes in flow. Real-time, automatic tracing of the Doppler flow profile allows beat-to-beat right-sided and left-sided Q measurements, simplifying operation and reducing the time of acquisition compared to conventional echocardiography. USCOM has been validated from 0.12 L/min to 18.7 L/min in new-born babies, children and adults. The method can be applied with equal accuracy to patients of all ages for the development of physiologically rational haemodynamic protocols. USCOM is the only method of cardiac output measurement to have achieved equivalent accuracy to the implantable flow probe. This accuracy has ensured high levels of clinical use in conditions including sepsis, heart failure and hypertension.

==== Transoesophageal ====
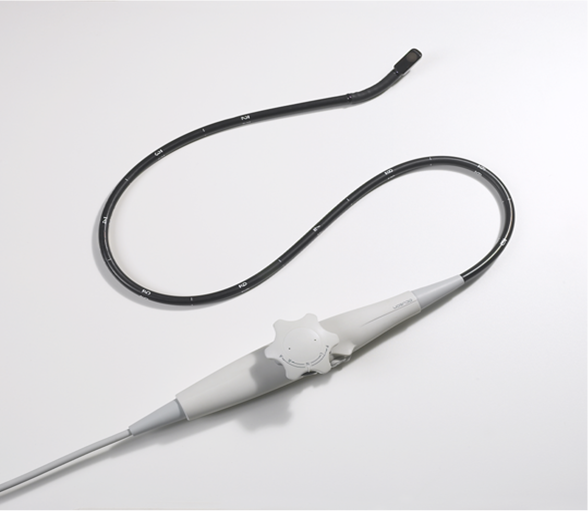
A transoesophageal echocardiogram probe.

The Transoesophageal Doppler includes two main technologies; transoesophageal echocardiogram—which is primarily used for diagnostic purposes, and oesophageal Doppler monitoring—which is primarily used for the clinical monitoring of cardiac output. The latter uses continuous wave Doppler to measure blood velocity in the descending thoracic aorta. An ultrasound probe is inserted either orally or nasally into the oesophagus to mid-thoracic level, at which point the oesophagus lies alongside the descending thoracic aorta. Because the transducer is close to the blood flow, the signal is clear. The probe may require re-focussing to ensure an optimal signal. This method has good validation, is widely used for fluid management during surgery with evidence for improved patient outcome, and has been recommended by the UK's National Institute for Health and Clinical Excellence (NICE). Oesophageal Doppler monitoring measures the velocity of blood and not true Q, therefore relies on a nomogram based on patient age, height and weight to convert the measured velocity into stroke volume and cardiac output. This method generally requires patient sedation and is accepted for use in both adults and children.

=== Pulse pressure methods ===
Pulse pressure (PP) methods measure the pressure in an artery over time to derive a waveform and use this information to calculate cardiac performance. However, any measure from the artery includes changes in pressure associated with changes in arterial function, for example compliance and impedance. Physiological or therapeutic changes in vessel diameter are assumed to reflect changes in Q. PP methods measure the combined performance of the heart and the blood vessels, thus limiting their application for measurement of Q. This can be partially compensated for by intermittent calibration of the waveform to another Q measurement method then monitoring the PP waveform. Ideally, the PP waveform should be calibrated on a beat-to-beat basis. There are invasive and non-invasive methods of measuring PP.

==== Finapres methodology ====
In 1967, the Czech physiologist Jan Peňáz invented and patented the volume clamp method of measuring continuous blood pressure. The principle of the volume clamp method is to dynamically provide equal pressures, on either side of an artery wall. By clamping the artery to a certain volume, inside pressure—intra-arterial pressure—balances outside pressure—finger cuff pressure. Peñáz decided the finger was the optimal site to apply this volume clamp method. The use of finger cuffs excludes the device from application in patients without vasoconstriction, such as in sepsis or in patients on vasopressors.

In 1978, scientists at BMI-TNO, the research unit of Netherlands Organisation for Applied Scientific Research at the University of Amsterdam, invented and patented a series of additional key elements that make the volume clamp work in clinical practice. These methods include the use of modulated infrared light in the optical system inside the sensor, the lightweight, easy-to-wrap finger cuff with velcro fixation, a new pneumatic proportional control valve principle, and a set point strategy for the determining and tracking the correct volume at which to clamp the finger arteries—the Physiocal system. An acronym for physiological calibration of the finger arteries, this Physiocal tracker was found to be accurate, robust and reliable.

The Finapres methodology was developed to use this information to calculate arterial pressure from finger cuff pressure data. A generalised algorithm to correct for the pressure level difference between the finger and brachial sites in patients was developed. This correction worked under all of the circumstances it was tested in—even when it was not designed for it—because it applied general physiological principles. This innovative brachial pressure waveform reconstruction method was first implemented in the Finometer, the successor of Finapres that BMI-TNO introduced to the market in 2000.

The availability of a continuous, high-fidelity, calibrated blood pressure waveform opened up the perspective of beat-to-beat computation of integrated haemodynamics, based on two notions: pressure and flow are inter-related at each site in the arterial system by their so-called characteristic impedance. At the proximal aortic site, the 3-element Windkessel model of this impedance can be modelled with sufficient accuracy in an individual patient with known age, gender, height and weight. According to comparisons of non-invasive peripheral vascular monitors, modest clinical utility is restricted to patients with normal and invariant circulation.

==== Invasive ====
Invasive PP monitoring involves inserting a manometer pressure sensor into an artery—usually the radial or femoral artery—and continuously measuring the PP waveform. This is generally done by connecting the catheter to a signal processing device with a display. The PP waveform can then be analysed to provide measurements of cardiovascular performance. Changes in vascular function, the position of the catheter tip or damping of the pressure waveform signal will affect the accuracy of the readings. Invasive PP measurements can be calibrated or uncalibrated.

===== Calibrated PP – PiCCO, LiDCO =====
PiCCO (PULSION Medical Systems AG, Munich, Germany) and PulseCO (LiDCO Ltd, London, England) generate continuous Q by analysing the arterial PP waveform. In both cases, an independent technique is required to provide calibration of continuous Q analysis because arterial PP analysis cannot account for unmeasured variables such as the changing compliance of the vascular bed. Recalibration is recommended after changes in patient position, therapy or condition.

In PiCCO, transpulmonary thermodilution, which uses the Stewart-Hamilton principle but measures temperatures changes from central venous line to a central arterial line, i.e., the femoral or axillary arterial line, is used as the calibrating technique. The Q value derived from cold-saline thermodilution is used to calibrate the arterial PP contour, which can then provide continuous Q monitoring. The PiCCO algorithm is dependent on blood pressure waveform morphology (mathematical analysis of the PP waveform), and it calculates continuous Q as described by Wesseling and colleagues. Transpulmonary thermodilution spans right heart, pulmonary circulation and left heart, allowing further mathematical analysis of the thermodilution curve and giving measurements of cardiac filling volumes (GEDV), intrathoracic blood volume and extravascular lung water. Transpulmonary thermodilution allows for less invasive Q calibration but is less accurate than PA thermodilution and requires a central venous and arterial line with the accompanied infection risks.

In LiDCO, the independent calibration technique is lithium chloride dilution using the Stewart-Hamilton principle. Lithium chloride dilution uses a peripheral vein and a peripheral arterial line. Like PiCCO, frequent calibration is recommended when there is a change in Q. Calibration events are limited in frequency because they involve the injection of lithium chloride and can be subject to errors in the presence of certain muscle relaxants. The PulseCO algorithm used by LiDCO is based on pulse power derivation and is not dependent on waveform morphology.

===== Statistical analysis of arterial pressure – FloTrac/Vigileo =====
FloTrac/Vigileo (Edwards Lifesciences) is an uncalibrated, haemodynamic monitor based on pulse contour analysis. It estimates cardiac output (Q) using a standard arterial catheter with a manometer located in the femoral or radial artery. The device consists of a high-fidelity pressure transducer, which, when used with a supporting monitor (Vigileo or EV1000 monitor), derives left-sided cardiac output (Q) from a sample of arterial pulsations. The device uses an algorithm based on the Frank–Starling law of the heart, which states pulse pressure (PP) is proportional to stroke volume (SV). The algorithm calculates the product of the standard deviation of the arterial pressure (AP) wave over a sampled period of 20 seconds and a vascular tone factor (Khi, or χ) to generate stroke volume. The equation in simplified form is: $SV = \mathrm{std}(AP) \cdot \chi$, or, $BP \cdot k \mathrm{\ (constant)}$. Khi is designed to reflect arterial resistance; compliance is a multivariate polynomial equation that continuously quantifies arterial compliance and vascular resistance. Khi does this by analyzing the morphological changes of arterial pressure waveforms on a bit-by-bit basis, based on the principle that changes in compliance or resistance affect the shape of the arterial pressure waveform. By analyzing the shape of said waveforms, the effect of vascular tone is assessed, allowing the calculation of SV. Q is then derived using equation (1). Only perfused beats that generate an arterial waveform are counted for in HR.

This system estimates Q using an existing arterial catheter with variable accuracy. These arterial monitors do not require intracardiac catheterisation from a pulmonary artery catheter. They require an arterial line and are therefore invasive. As with other arterial waveform systems, the short set-up and data acquisition times are benefits of this technology. Disadvantages include its inability to provide data regarding right-sided heart pressures or mixed venous oxygen saturation. The measurement of Stroke Volume Variation (SVV), which predicts volume responsiveness is intrinsic to all arterial waveform technologies. It is used for managing fluid optimisation in high-risk surgical or critically ill patients. A physiologic optimization program based on haemodynamic principles that incorporates the data pairs SV and SVV has been published.

Arterial monitoring systems are unable to predict changes in vascular tone; they estimate changes in vascular compliance. The measurement of pressure in the artery to calculate the flow in the heart is physiologically irrational and of questionable accuracy, and of unproven benefit. Arterial pressure monitoring is limited in patients off-ventilation, in atrial fibrillation, in patients on vasopressors, and in those with a dynamic autonomic system such as those with sepsis.

===== Uncalibrated, pre-estimated demographic data-free – PRAM =====
Pressure Recording Analytical Method (PRAM), estimates Q from the analysis of the pressure wave profile obtained from an arterial catheter—radial or femoral access. This PP waveform can then be used to determine Q. As the waveform is sampled at 1000 Hz, the detected pressure curve can be measured to calculate the actual beat-to-beat stroke volume. Unlike FloTrac, neither constant values of impedance from external calibration, nor form pre-estimated in vivo or in vitro data, are needed.

PRAM has been validated against the considered gold standard methods in stable condition and in various haemodynamic states. It can be used to monitor pediatric and mechanically supported patients.

Generally monitored haemodynamic values, fluid responsiveness parameters and an exclusive reference are provided by PRAM: Cardiac Cycle Efficiency (CCE). It is expressed by a pure number ranging from 1 (best) to -1 (worst) and it indicates the overall heart-vascular response coupling. The ratio between heart performance and consumed energy, represented as CCE "stress index", can be of paramount importance in understanding the patient's present and future courses.

=== Impedance cardiography ===
Impedance cardiography (often abbreviated as ICG, or Thoracic Electrical Bioimpedance (TEB)) measures changes in electrical impedance across the thoracic region over the cardiac cycle. Lower impedance indicates greater intrathoracic fluid volume and blood flow. By synchronizing fluid volume changes with the heartbeat, the change in impedance can be used to calculate stroke volume, cardiac output and systemic vascular resistance.

Both invasive and non-invasive approaches are used. The reliability and validity of the non-invasive approach has gained some acceptance, although there is not complete agreement on this point. The clinical use of this approach in the diagnosis, prognosis and therapy of a variety of diseases continues.

Non-invasive ICG equipment includes the Bio-Z Dx, the Niccomo, and TEBCO products by BoMed.

=== Ultrasound dilution ===
Ultrasound dilution (UD) uses body-temperature normal saline (NS) as an indicator introduced into an extracorporeal loop to create an atrioventricular (AV) circulation with an ultrasound sensor, which is used to measure the dilution then to calculate cardiac output using a proprietary algorithm. A number of other haemodynamic variables, such as total end-diastole volume (TEDV), central blood volume (CBV) and active circulation volume (ACVI) can be calculated using this method.

The UD method was firstly introduced in 1995. It was extensively used to measure flow and volumes with extracorporeal circuit conditions, such as ECMO and Haemodialysis, leading more than 150 peer reviewed publications. UD has now been adapted to intensive care units (ICU) as the COstatus device.

The UD method is based on ultrasound indicator dilution. Blood ultrasound velocity (1560–1585 m/s) is a function of total blood protein concentration—sums of proteins in plasma and in red blood red cells—and temperature. Injection of body-temperature normal saline (ultrasound velocity of saline is 1533 m/s) into a unique AV loop decreases blood ultrasound velocity, and produces dilution curves.

UD requires the establishment of an extracorporeal circulation through its unique AV loop with two pre-existing arterial and central venous lines in ICU patients. When the saline indicator is injected into the AV loop, it is detected by the venous clamp-on sensor on the loop before it enters the patient's heart's right atrium. After the indicator traverses the heart and lung, the concentration curve in the arterial line is recorded and displayed on the COstatus HCM101 Monitor. Cardiac output is calculated from the area of the concentration curve using the Stewart-Hamilton equation. UD is a non-invasive procedure, requiring only a connection to the AV loop and two lines from a patient. UD has been specialised for application in pediatric ICU patients and has been demonstrated to be relatively safe although invasive and reproducible.

=== Electrical cardiometry ===
Electrical cardiometry is a non-invasive method similar to Impedance cardiography; both methods measure thoracic electrical bioimpedance (TEB). The underlying model differs between the two methods; Electrical cardiometry attributes the steep increase of TEB beat-to-beat to the change in orientation of red blood cells. Four standard ECG electrodes are required for measurement of cardiac output. Electrical Cardiometry is a method trademarked by Cardiotronic, Inc., and shows promising results in a wide range of patients. It is currently approved in the US for use in adults, children and babies. Electrical cardiometry monitors have shown promise in postoperative cardiac surgical patients, in both haemodynamically stable and unstable cases.

=== Magnetic resonance imaging ===
Velocity-encoded phase contrast Magnetic resonance imaging (MRI) is the most accurate technique for measuring flow in large vessels in mammals. MRI flow measurements have been shown to be highly accurate compared to measurements made with a beaker and timer, and less variable than the Fick principle and thermodilution.

Velocity-encoded MRI is based on the detection of changes in the phase of proton precession. These changes are proportional to the velocity of the protons' movement through a magnetic field with a known gradient. When using velocity-encoded MRI, the result is two sets of images, one for each time point in the cardiac cycle. One is an anatomical image and the other is an image in which the signal intensity in each pixel is directly proportional to the through-plane velocity. The average velocity in a vessel, i.e., the aorta or the pulmonary artery, is quantified by measuring the average signal intensity of the pixels in the cross-section of the vessel then multiplying by a known constant. The flow is calculated by multiplying the mean velocity by the cross-sectional area of the vessel. This flow data can be used in a flow-versus-time graph. The area under the flow-versus-time curve for one cardiac cycle is the stroke volume. The length of the cardiac cycle is known and determines heart rate; Q can be calculated using equation (1). MRI is typically used to quantify the flow over one cardiac cycle as the average of several heart beats. It is also possible to quantify the stroke volume in real-time on a beat-for-beat basis.

While MRI is an important research tool for accurately measuring Q, it is currently not clinically used for haemodynamic monitoring in emergency or intensive care settings. As of 2015, cardiac output measurement by MRI is routinely used in clinical cardiac MRI examinations.

=== Dye dilution method ===
The dye dilution method is done by rapidly injecting a dye, indocyanine green, into the right atrium of the heart. The dye flows with the blood into the aorta. A probe is inserted into the aorta to measure the concentration of the dye leaving the heart at equal time intervals [0, T] until the dye has cleared. Let c(t) be the concentration of the dye at time t. By dividing the time intervals from [0, T] into subintervals Δt, the amount of dye that flows past the measuring point during the subinterval from $t=t_{i-1}$ to $t=t_i$ is:

$(concentration)(volume)=c(t_i)(F\Delta t)$

where $F$ is the rate of flow that is being calculated. The total amount of dye is:

$\sum_{i=1}^nc(t_i)(F\Delta t)=F \sum_{i=1}^nc(t_i)(\Delta t)$

and, letting $n\rightarrow\infty$, the amount of dye is:

$A=F\int_{0}^{T} c(t)dt$

Thus, the cardiac output is given by:

$F=\frac{A}{\int_{0}^{T} c(t)dt}$

where the amount of dye injected $A$ is known, and the integral can be determined using the concentration readings.

The dye dilution method is one of the most accurate methods of determining cardiac output during exercise. The error of a single calculation of cardiac output values at rest and during exercise is less than 5%. This method does not allow measurement of 'beat to beat' changes, and requires a cardiac output that is stable for approximately 10 s during exercise and 30 s at rest.

== Factors influencing cardiac output ==
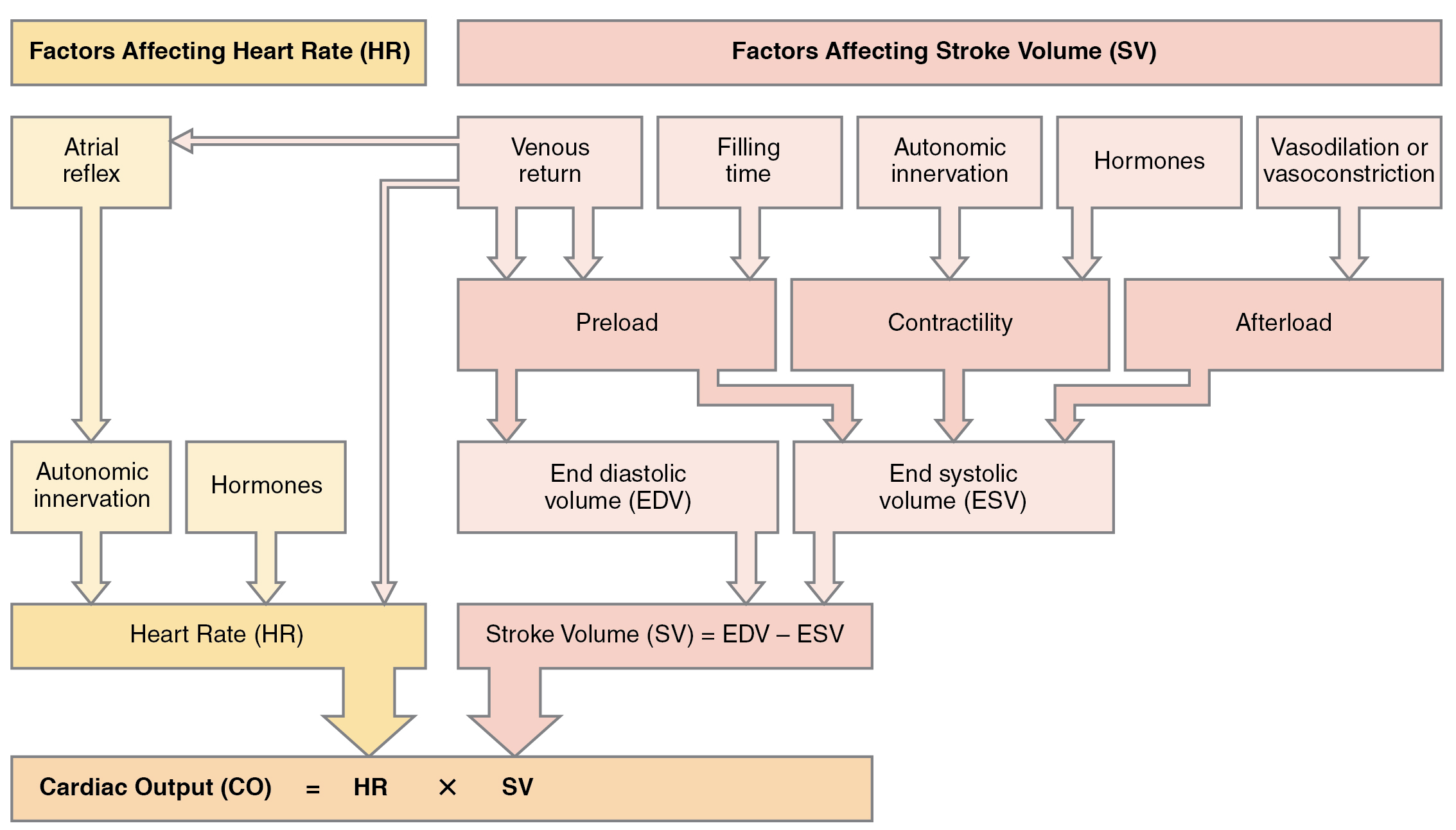
Hierarchical summary of major factors influencing cardiac output.

Cardiac output is primarily controlled by the oxygen requirement of tissues in the body. In contrast to other pump systems, the heart is a demand pump that does not regulate its own output. When the body has a high metabolic oxygen demand, the metabolically controlled flow through the tissues is increased, leading to a greater flow of blood back to the heart, leading to higher cardiac output.

The capacitance, also known as compliance, of the arterio-vascular channels that carry the blood also controls cardiac output. As the body's blood vessels actively expand and contract, the resistance to blood flow decreases and increases respectively. Thin-walled veins have about eighteen times the capacitance of thick-walled arteries because they are able to carry more blood by virtue of being more distensible.

From this formula, it is clear the factors affecting stroke volume and heart rate also affect cardiac output. The figure to the right illustrates this dependency and lists a few of these factors. A more detailed hierarchical illustration is provided in a subsequent figure.

Equation (1) reveals HR and SV to be the primary determinants of cardiac output Q. A detailed representation of these factors is illustrated in the figure to the right. The primary factors that influence HR are autonomic innervation plus endocrine control. Environmental factors, such as electrolytes, metabolic products, and temperature are not shown. The determinants of SV during the cardiac cycle are the contractility of the heart muscle, the degree of preload of myocardial distention prior to shortening and the afterload during ejection. Other factors such as electrolytes may be classified as either positive or negative inotropic agents.

=== Cardiac response ===
Table 3: Cardiac response to decreasing blood flow and pressure due to decreasing cardiac output
	Baroreceptors (aorta, carotid arteries, venae cavae, and atria)	Chemoreceptors (both central nervous system and in proximity to baroreceptors)
Sensitive to	Decreasing stretch	Decreasing O_{2} and increasing CO_{2}, H^{+}, and lactic acid
Target	Parasympathetic stimulation suppressed	Sympathetic stimulation increased
Response of heart	Increasing heart rate and increasing stroke volume	Increasing heart rate and increasing stroke volume
Overall effect	Increasing blood flow and pressure due to increasing cardiac output; haemostasis restored	Increasing blood flow and pressure due to increasing cardiac output; haemostasis restored

Table 4: Cardiac response to increasing blood flow and pressure due to increasing cardiac output
	Baroreceptors (aorta, carotid arteries, venae cavae, and atria)	Chemoreceptors (both central nervous system and in proximity to baroreceptors)
Sensitive to	Increasing stretch	Increasing O_{2} and decreasing CO_{2}, H^{+}, and lactic acid
Target	Parasympathetic stimulation increased	Sympathetic stimulation suppressed
Response of heart	Decreasing heart rate and decreasing stroke volume	Decreasing heart rate and decreasing stroke volume
Overall effect	Decreasing blood flow and pressure due to decreasing cardiac output; haemostasis restored	Decreasing blood flow and pressure due to decreasing cardiac output; haemostasis restored

== Clinical significance ==
When Q increases in a healthy but untrained individual, most of the increase can be attributed to an increase in heart rate (HR). Change of posture, increased sympathetic nervous system activity, and decreased parasympathetic nervous system activity can also increase cardiac output. HR can vary by a factor of approximately 3—between 60 and 180 beats per minute—while stroke volume (SV) can vary between 70 and 120 mL (2.5 and 4.2 imp fl oz; 2.4 and 4.1 US fl oz), a factor of only 1.7.

Diseases of the cardiovascular system are often associated with changes in Q, particularly the pandemic diseases hypertension and heart failure. Increased Q can be associated with cardiovascular disease that can occur during infection and sepsis. Decreased Q can be associated with cardiomyopathy and heart failure. Sometimes, in the presence of ventricular disease associated with dilatation, EDV may vary. An increase in EDV could counterbalance LV dilatation and impaired contraction. From equation (3), the resulting cardiac output Q may remain constant. The ability to accurately measure Q is important in clinical medicine because it provides for improved diagnosis of abnormalities and can be used to guide appropriate management.

== Example values ==
Ventricular volumes
Measure	Right ventricle	Left ventricle
End-diastolic volume	144 mL (± 23 mL)	142 mL (± 21 mL)
End-diastolic volume / body surface area (mL/m^{2})	78 mL/m^{2} (± 11 mL/m^{2})	78 mL/m^{2} (± 8.8 mL/m^{2})
End-systolic volume	50 mL (± 14 mL)	47 mL (± 10 mL)
End-systolic volume / body surface area (mL/m^{2})	27 mL/m^{2} (± 7 mL/m^{2})	26 mL/m^{2} (± 5.1 mL/m^{2})
Stroke volume	94 mL (± 15 mL)	95 mL (± 14 mL)
Stroke volume / body surface area (mL/m^{2})	51 mL/m^{2} (± 7 mL/m^{2})	52 mL/m^{2} (± 6.2 mL/m^{2})
Ejection fraction	66% (± 6%)	67% (± 4.6%)
Heart rate	60–100 bpm	60–100 bpm
Cardiac output	4.0–8.0 L/minute	4.0–8.0 L/minute

== Related measurements ==
=== Ejection fraction ===
Ejection fraction (EF) is a parameter related to SV. EF is the fraction of blood ejected by the left ventricle (LV) during the contraction or ejection phase of the cardiac cycle or systole. Prior to the start of systole, during the filling phase (diastole), the LV is filled with blood to the capacity known as end diastolic volume (EDV). During systole, the LV contracts and ejects blood until it reaches its minimum capacity known as end systolic volume (ESV). It does not completely empty. The following equations help translate the effect of EF and EDV on cardiac output Q, via SV.

$$\begin{align} SV &= EDV - ESV \\ EF &= \frac{SV}{EDV} \times 100\% \\ Q &= SV \times HR \\ &= \frac{EF \times EDV \times HR}{100\%} \end{align}$$	3

=== Cardiac input ===
Cardiac input (CI) is the inverse operation of cardiac output. As cardiac output implies the volumetric expression of ejection fraction, cardiac input implies the volumetric injection fraction (IF).

IF = end diastolic volume (EDV) / end systolic volume (ESV)

Cardiac input is a readily imaged mathematical model of diastole.

=== Cardiac index ===
In all resting mammals of normal mass, CO value is a linear function of body mass with a slope of 0.1 L/(min kg). Fat has about 65% of oxygen demand per mass in comparison to other lean body tissues. As a result, the calculation of normal CO value in an obese subject is more complex; a single, common "normal" value of SV and CO for adults cannot exist. All blood flow parameters have to be indexed. It is accepted convention to index them by the body surface area, BSA [m^{2}], by DuBois & DuBois Formula, a function of height and weight:

$$BSA_\mathrm{[m^2]} = W^{0.425}_\mathrm{[kg]} \times H^{0.725}_\mathrm{[cm]} \times 0.007184$$

The resulting indexed parameters are stroke index (SI) and cardiac index (CI). Stroke index, measured in mL/beat/m^{2}, is defined as

$$SI_\mathrm{[mL/beat/{m}^2]} = \frac{SV_\mathrm{[mL]}}{BSA_\mathrm{[m^2]}}$$

Cardiac index, measured in L/(min m^{2}), is defined as
$$CI_\mathrm{[L/min/{m}^2]} = \frac{CO_\mathrm{[L/min]}}{BSA_\mathrm{[{m}^2]}}$$

The CO equation (1) for indexed parameters then changes to the following.

$CI_\mathrm{[L/min/{m}^2]} = ( SI_\mathrm{[mL/beat/{m}^2]} \times HR_\mathrm{[bpm]} ) / 1000$	2

The normal range for these indexed blood flow parameters are between 35 and 65 mL/beat/m^{2} for SI and between 2.5 and 4 L/(min m^{2}) for CI.

=== Combined cardiac output ===
Combined cardiac output is the sum of the outputs of the right and left sides of the heart. It is a useful measurement in fetal circulation, where cardiac outputs from both sides of the heart work partly in parallel by the foramen ovale and ductus arteriosus, which directly supply the systemic circulation.

== Historical methods ==
=== Fick principle ===
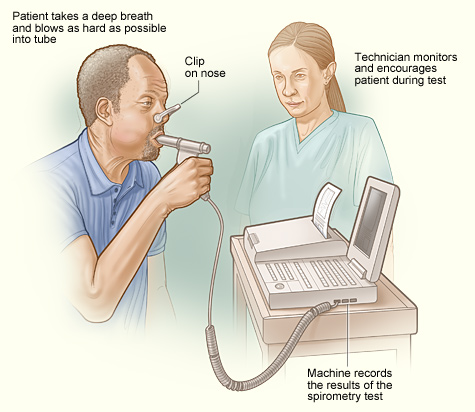
An illustration of how spirometry is done

The Fick principle, first described by Adolf Eugen Fick in 1870, assumes the rate of oxygen consumption is a function of the rate of blood flow and the rate of oxygen picked up by the red blood cells. Application of the Fick principle involves calculating the oxygen consumed over time by measuring the oxygen concentration of venous blood and arterial blood. Q is calculated from these measurements as follows:

- V_{O_{2}} consumption per minute using a spirometer (with the subject re-breathing air) and a CO_{2} absorber
- the oxygen content of blood taken from the pulmonary artery (representing mixed venous blood)
- the oxygen content of blood from a cannula in a peripheral artery (representing arterial blood)

From these values, we know that:

$$V_\ce{O2} = (Q \times C_A) - (Q \times C_V)$$

where

- C_{A} is the oxygen content of arterial blood, and,
- C_{V} is the oxygen content of venous blood.

This allows us to say

$$Q\ = \frac{{V}_\ce{O2}}{{C}_{A} - {C}_{V}}$$

and therefore calculate Q. (C_{A} – C_{V}) is also known as the arteriovenous oxygen difference.

While considered to be the most accurate method of measuring Q, the Fick method is invasive and requires time for sample analysis, and accurate oxygen consumption samples are difficult to acquire. There have been modifications to the Fick method where respiratory oxygen content is measured as part of a closed system and the consumed oxygen is calculated using an assumed oxygen consumption index, which is then used to calculate Q. Other variations use inert gases as tracers and measure the change in inspired and expired gas concentrations to calculate Q (Innocor, Innovision A/S, Denmark).

The calculation of the arterial and venous oxygen content of the blood is a straightforward process. Almost all oxygen in the blood is bound to hæmoglobin molecules in the red blood cells. Measuring the content of hæmoglobin in the blood and the percentage of saturation of hæmoglobin—the oxygen saturation of the blood—is a simple process and is readily available to physicians. Each gram of haemoglobin can carry 1.34 mL of O_{2}; the oxygen content of the blood—either arterial or venous—can be estimated using the following formula:

$$\begin{align}
\text{Oxygen content of blood} &= \left [\text{haemoglobin} \right] \left ( \text{g/dL} \right ) \ \times\ 1.34 \left ( \text{mL}\ \ce{O2} /\text{g of haemoglobin} \right ) \\
&\times\ \text{saturation of blood}\ \left ( \text{percent} \right )\ +\ 0.0032\ \times\ \text{partial pressure of oxygen} \left ( \text{torr} \right )
\end{align}$$

=== Pulmonary artery thermodilution (trans-right-heart thermodilution) ===
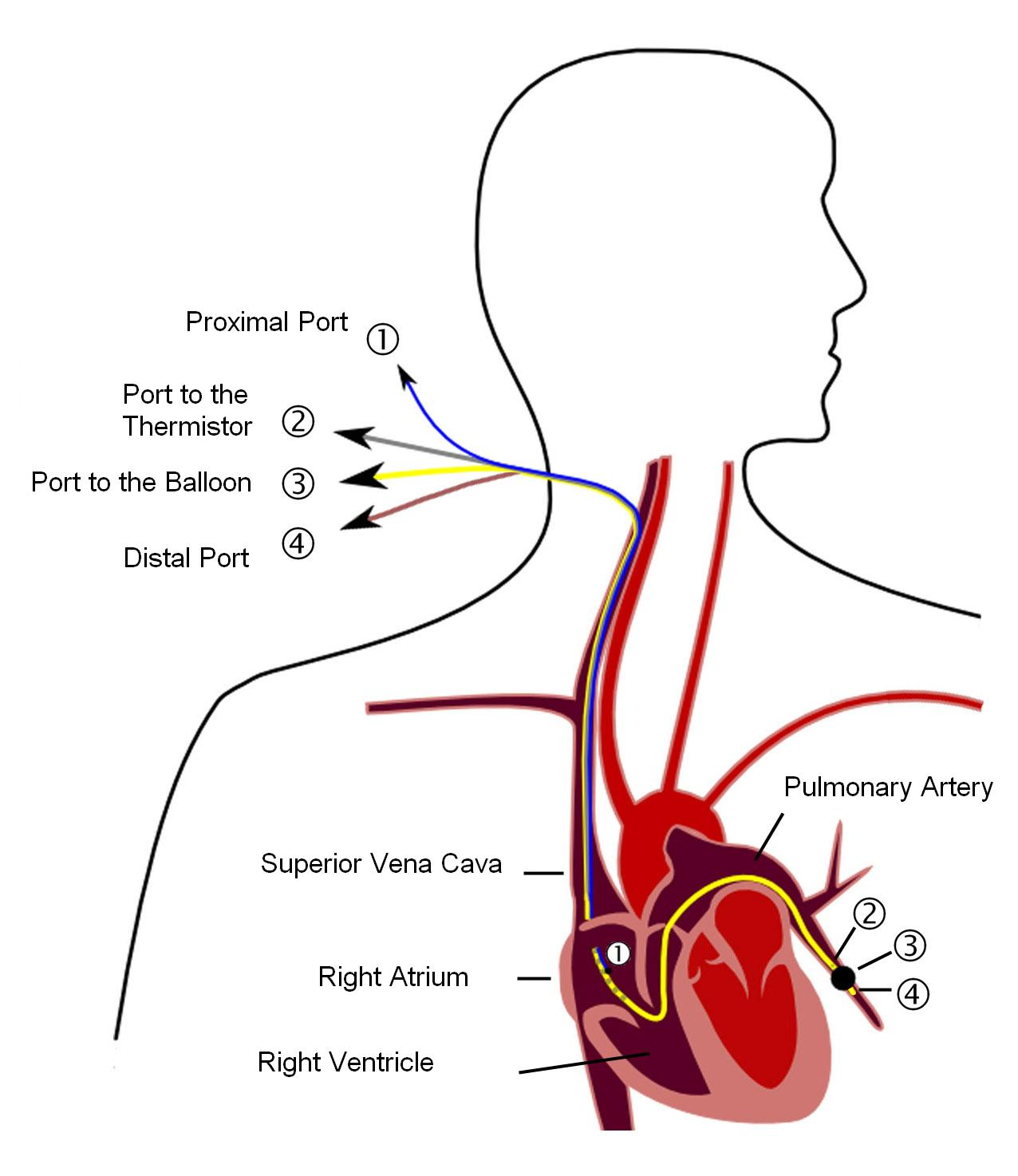
Diagram of Pulmonary artery catheter (PAC)

The indicator method was further developed by replacing the indicator dye with heated or cooled fluid. Temperature changes rather than dye concentration are measured at sites in the circulation; this method is known as thermodilution. The pulmonary artery catheter (PAC) introduced to clinical practice in 1970, also known as the Swan-Ganz catheter, provides direct access to the right heart for thermodilution measurements. Continuous, invasive, cardiac monitoring in intensive care units has been mostly phased out. The PAC remains useful in right-heart study done in cardiac catheterisation laboratories.

The PAC is balloon tipped and is inflated, which helps "sail" the catheter balloon through the right ventricle to occlude a small branch of the pulmonary artery system. The balloon is then deflated. The PAC thermodilution method involves the injection of a small amount (10 mL) of cold glucose at a known temperature into the pulmonary artery and measuring the temperature a known distance away 6–10 cm (2.4–3.9 in) using the same catheter with temperature sensors set apart at a known distance.

The historically significant Swan-Ganz multi-lumen catheter allows reproducible calculation of cardiac output from a measured time-temperature curve, also known as the thermodilution curve. Thermistor technology enabled the observations that low CO registers temperature change slowly and high CO registers temperature change rapidly. The degree of temperature change is directly proportional to the cardiac output. In this unique method, three or four repeated measurements or passes are usually averaged to improve accuracy. Modern catheters are fitted with heating filaments that intermittently heat up and measure the thermodilution curve, providing serial Q measurements. These instruments average measurements over 2–9 minutes depending on the stability of the circulation, and thus do not provide continuous monitoring.

PAC use can be complicated by arrhythmias, infection, pulmonary artery rupture and damage to the right heart valve. Recent studies in patients with critical illnesses, sepsis, acute respiratory failure and heart failure suggest that use of the PAC does not improve patient outcomes. This clinical ineffectiveness may relate to its poor accuracy and sensitivity, which have been demonstrated by comparison with flow probes across a sixfold range of Q values. Use of PAC is in decline as clinicians move to less invasive and more accurate technologies for monitoring hæmodynamics.

== See also ==
- Arthur Guyton
- Venous return
- Right atrial pressure
- Central venous pressure
- Quantium Medical Cardiac Output
