= Pulmonary wedge pressure =

Estimation of pressure in the heart

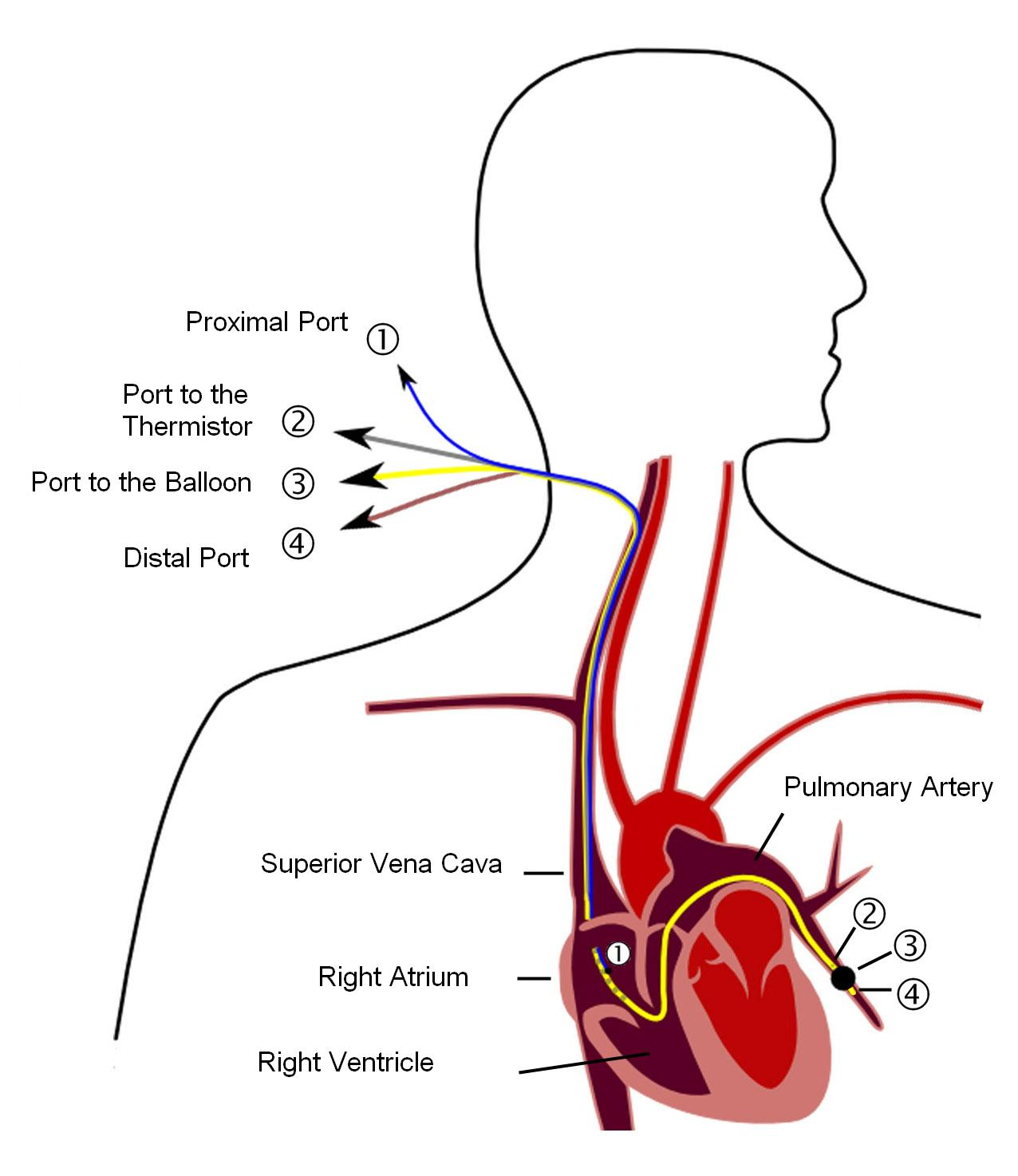
Diagram of a pulmonary artery catheter in position

The pulmonary wedge pressure, also called pulmonary arterial wedge pressure, pulmonary capillary wedge pressure, pulmonary artery occlusion pressure, or cross-sectional pressure, is the pressure measured by wedging a pulmonary artery catheter with an inflated balloon into a small pulmonary arterial branch. It estimates the left atrial pressure.

Pulmonary venous wedge pressure is not synonymous with the above; it has been shown to correlate with pulmonary artery pressures in studies, albeit unreliably.

Physiologically, distinctions can be drawn among pulmonary artery pressure, pulmonary capillary wedge pressure, pulmonary venous pressure and left atrial pressure, but not all of these can be measured in a clinical context.

Noninvasive estimation techniques have been proposed.

== Clinical significance ==
Site		Normal pressure range (in mmHg)
Central venous pressure		3–8
Right ventricular pressure	systolic	15–30
Right ventricular pressure	diastolic	3–8
Pulmonary artery pressure	systolic	15–30
Pulmonary artery pressure	diastolic	4–12
Pulmonary vein/ Pulmonary capillary wedge pressure		2–15
Left ventricular pressure	systolic	100–140
Left ventricular pressure	diastolic	3–12

Because of the large compliance of pulmonary circulation, it provides an indirect measure of the left atrial pressure.

For example, it is considered the gold standard for determining the cause of acute pulmonary edema; this is likely to be present at a pulmonary wedge pressure of greater than 20mmHg. It has also been used to diagnose severity of left ventricular failure and mitral stenosis, given that elevated pulmonary capillary wedge pressure strongly suggests failure of left ventricular output.

Traditionally, it was believed that pulmonary edema with normal pulmonary wedge pressure suggested a diagnosis of acute respiratory distress syndrome or non cardiogenic pulmonary edema (as in opiate poisoning). However, since capillary hydrostatic pressure exceeds wedge pressure once the balloon is deflated (to promote a gradient for forward flow), a normal wedge pressure cannot conclusively differentiate between hydrostatic pulmonary edema and acute respiratory distress syndrome.

Physiological pulmonary wedge pressure is 6–12 mm Hg.
