= Pathophysiology of heart failure =

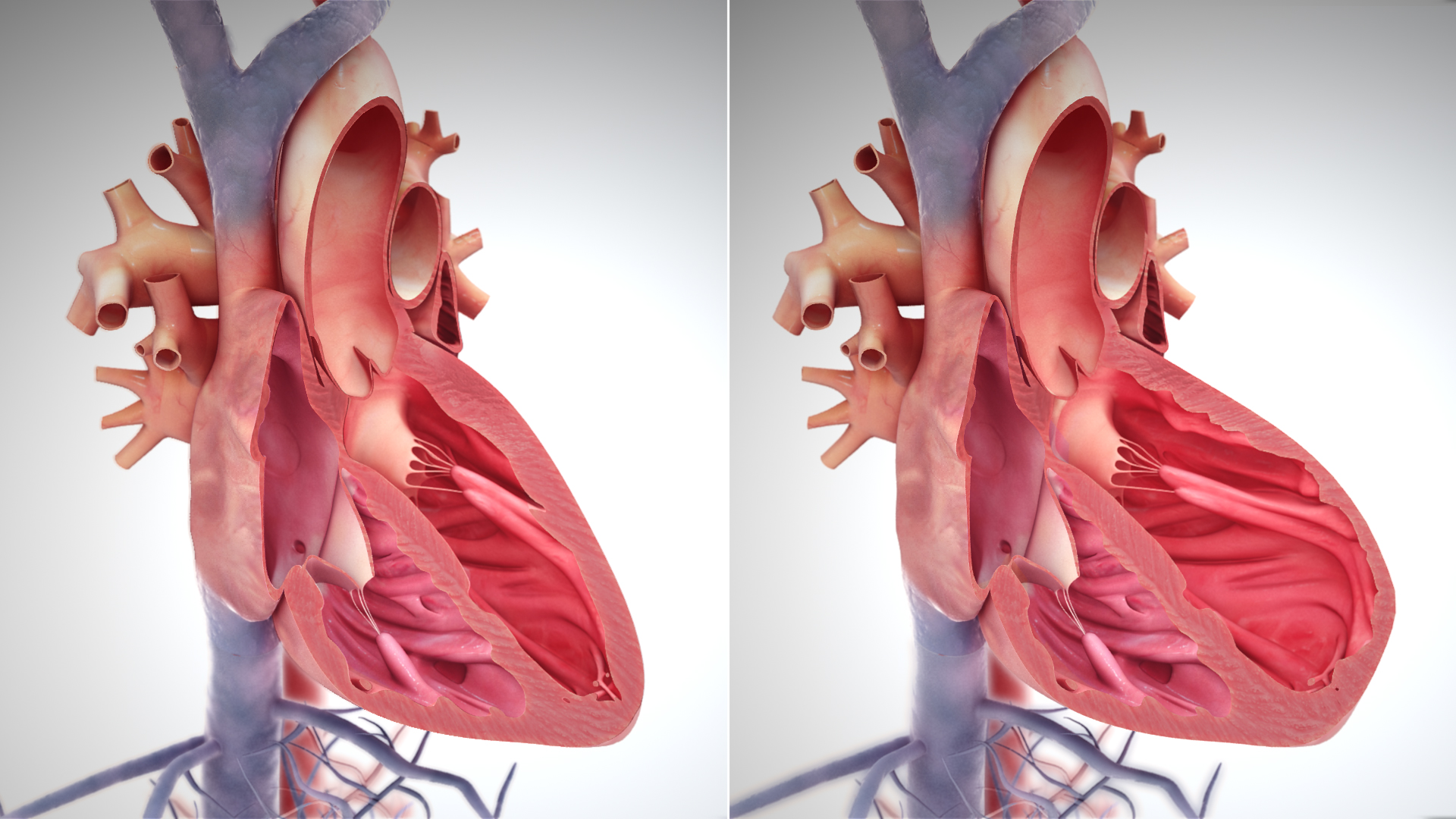
A comparison of healthy heart with contracted muscle (left) and a weakened heart with over-stretched muscle (right).

The main pathophysiology of heart failure is a reduction in the efficiency of the heart muscle, through damage or overloading. As such, it can be caused by a wide number of conditions, including myocardial infarction (in which the heart muscle is starved of oxygen and dies), hypertension (which increases the force of contraction needed to pump blood) and cardiac amyloidosis (in which misfolded proteins are deposited in the heart muscle, causing it to stiffen). Over time these increases in workload will produce changes to the heart itself.

== Cardiac pump failure ==
The heart of a person with heart failure may have a reduced force of contraction due to overloading of the ventricle. In a healthy heart, increased filling of the ventricle results in increased contraction force (by the Frank–Starling law of the heart) and thus a rise in cardiac output. In heart failure, this mechanism fails, as the ventricle is loaded with blood to the point where heart muscle contraction becomes less efficient. This is due to reduced ability to cross-link actin and myosin filaments in over-stretched heart muscle.

A reduced stroke volume may occur as a result of a failure of systole, diastole or both. Increased end systolic volume is usually caused by reduced contractility. Decreased end diastolic volume results from impaired ventricular filling; this occurs when the compliance of the ventricle falls (i.e. when the walls stiffen). As the heart works harder to meet normal metabolic demands, the amount cardiac output can increase in times of increased oxygen demand (e.g., exercise) is reduced. This contributes to the exercise intolerance commonly seen in heart failure. This translates to the loss of one's cardiac reserve, or the ability of the heart to work harder during strenuous physical activity. Since the heart has to work harder to meet the normal metabolic demands, it is incapable of meeting the metabolic demands of the body during exercise.

== Compensatory mechanisms ==
A common finding in those with heart failure is an increased heart rate, stimulated by increased sympathetic activity in order to maintain an adequate cardiac output. Initially, this helps compensate for heart failure by maintaining blood pressure and perfusion, but places further strain on the myocardium, increasing coronary perfusion requirements, which can lead to worsening of ischemic heart disease. Sympathetic activity may also cause potentially fatal abnormal heart rhythms. An increase in the physical size of the heart's muscular layer may occur. This is caused by the terminally differentiated heart muscle fibers increasing in size in an attempt to improve contractility. This may contribute to the increased stiffness and thus decrease the ability to relax during diastole. Enlargement of the ventricles can also occur and contributes to the enlargement and spherical shape of the failing heart. The increase in ventricular volume also causes a reduction in stroke volume due to mechanical and inefficient contraction of the heart.

== Changes to the body ==
The general effect is one of reduced cardiac output and increased strain on the heart. This increases the risk of cardiac arrest (specifically due to abnormal ventricular heart rhythms) and reduces blood supply to the rest of the body. In chronic disease the reduced cardiac output causes a number of changes in the rest of the body, some of which are physiological compensations, some of which are part of the disease process:

- Arterial blood pressure falls. This destimulates baroreceptors in the carotid sinus and aortic arch which link to the nucleus tractus solitarii. This center in the brain increases sympathetic activity, releasing catecholamines into the bloodstream. Binding to alpha-1 receptors results in systemic arterial vasoconstriction. This helps restore blood pressure but also increases the total peripheral resistance, increasing the workload of the heart. Binding to beta-1 receptors in the myocardium increases the heart rate and makes contractions more forceful in an attempt to increase cardiac output. This also, however, increases the amount of work the heart has to perform.
- Increased sympathetic stimulation also causes the posterior pituitary to secrete vasopressin (also known as antidiuretic hormone or ADH), which causes fluid retention at the kidneys. This increases the blood volume and blood pressure.
- Heart failure also limits the kidneys' ability to dispose of sodium and water, which further increases edema. Reduced blood flow to the kidneys stimulates the release of renin – an enzyme which catalyses the production of the potent vasopressor angiotensin. Angiotensin and its metabolites cause further vasoconstriction, and stimulate increased secretion of the steroid aldosterone from the adrenal glands. This promotes salt and fluid retention at the kidneys.
- The chronically high levels of circulating neuroendocrine hormones such as catecholamines, renin, angiotensin, and aldosterone affect the myocardium directly, causing structural remodelling of the heart over the long term. Many of these remodelling effects seem to be mediated by transforming growth factor beta (TGF-beta), which is a common downstream target of the signal transduction cascade initiated by catecholamines and angiotensin II, and also by epidermal growth factor (EGF), which is a target of the signaling pathway activated by aldosterone
- Reduced perfusion of skeletal muscle causes atrophy of the muscle fibers. This can result in weakness, increased fatiguability and decreased peak strength – all contributing to exercise intolerance.

== Side dependant symptoms ==
The increased peripheral resistance and greater blood volume place further strain on the heart and accelerates the process of damage to the myocardium. Vasoconstriction and fluid retention produce an increased hydrostatic pressure in the capillaries. This shifts the balance of forces in favor of interstitial fluid formation as the increased pressure forces additional fluid out of the blood, into the tissue. This results in edema (fluid build-up) in the tissues. In right-sided heart failure, this commonly starts in the ankles where venous pressure is high due to the effects of gravity (although if the patient is bed-ridden, fluid accumulation may begin in the sacral region). It may also occur in the abdominal cavity, where the fluid buildup is called ascites. In left-sided heart failure edema can occur in the lungs – this is called cardiogenic pulmonary edema. This reduces spare capacity for ventilation, causes stiffening of the lungs and reduces the efficiency of gas exchange by increasing the distance between the air and the blood. The consequences of this are dyspnea (shortness of breath), orthopnea and paroxysmal nocturnal dyspnea.

The symptoms of heart failure are largely determined by which side of the heart fails. The left side pumps blood into the systemic circulation, whilst the right side pumps blood into the pulmonary circulation. Whilst left-sided heart failure will reduce cardiac output to the systemic circulation, the initial symptoms often manifest due to effects on the pulmonary circulation. In systolic dysfunction, the ejection fraction is decreased, leaving an abnormally elevated volume of blood in the left ventricle. In diastolic dysfunction, the end-diastolic ventricular pressure will be high. This increase in volume or pressure backs up to the left atrium and then to the pulmonary veins. Increased volume or pressure in the pulmonary veins impairs the normal drainage of the alveoli and favors the flow of fluid from the capillaries to the lung parenchyma, causing pulmonary edema. This impairs gas exchange. Thus, left-sided heart failure often presents with respiratory symptoms: shortness of breath, orthopnea, and paroxysmal nocturnal dyspnea.

In severe cardiomyopathy, the effects of decreased cardiac output and poor perfusion become more apparent, and patients will manifest with cold and clammy extremities, cyanosis, claudication, generalized weakness, dizziness, and fainting.

The resultant low blood oxygen caused by pulmonary edema causes vasoconstriction in the pulmonary circulation, which results in pulmonary hypertension. Since the right ventricle generates far lower pressures than the left ventricle (approximately 20 mmHg versus around 120 mmHg, respectively, in the healthy individual) but nonetheless generates cardiac output exactly equal to the left ventricle, this means that a small increase in pulmonary vascular resistance causes a large increase in amount of work the right ventricle must perform. However, the main mechanism by which left-sided heart failure causes right-sided heart failure is actually not well understood. Some theories invoke mechanisms that are mediated by neurohormonal activation. Mechanical effects may also contribute. As the left ventricle distends, the intraventricular septum bows into the right ventricle, decreasing the capacity of the right ventricle.

== Systolic dysfunction ==
Heart failure caused by systolic dysfunction is more readily recognized. It can be simplistically described as a failure of the pump function of the heart. It is characterized by a decreased ejection fraction (less than 45%). The strength of ventricular contraction is attenuated and inadequate for creating an adequate stroke volume, resulting in inadequate cardiac output. In general, this is caused by dysfunction or destruction of cardiac myocytes or their molecular components. In congenital diseases such as Duchenne muscular dystrophy, the molecular structure of individual myocytes is affected. Myocytes and their components can be damaged by inflammation (such as in myocarditis) or by infiltration (such as in amyloidosis). Toxins and pharmacological agents (such as ethanol, cocaine, doxorubicin, and amphetamines) cause intracellular damage and oxidative stress. The most common mechanism of damage is ischemia causing infarction and scar formation. After myocardial infarction, dead myocytes are replaced by scar tissue, deleteriously affecting the function of the myocardium. On echocardiogram, this is manifest by abnormal wall motion (hypokinesia) or absent wall motion (akinesia).

Because the ventricle is inadequately emptied, ventricular end-diastolic pressure and volumes increase. This is transmitted to the atrium. On the left side of the heart, the increased pressure is transmitted to the pulmonary vasculature, and the resultant hydrostatic pressure favors extravasation of fluid into the lung parenchyma, causing pulmonary edema. On the right side of the heart, the increased pressure is transmitted to the systemic venous circulation and systemic capillary beds, favoring extravasation of fluid into the tissues of target organs and extremities, resulting in dependent peripheral edema.

== Diastolic dysfunction ==
Heart failure caused by diastolic dysfunction is generally described as the backward failure of the ventricle to adequately relax and typically denotes a stiffer ventricular wall. The "stiffness" and contractility of the ventricular walls in diastole was first described by Pierre-Simon Laplace. This causes inadequate filling of the ventricle and therefore results in an inadequate stroke volume (SV). SV is a mathematical term amenable to manipulation of many variables. The failure of ventricular relaxation also results in elevated end-diastolic pressures, and the end result is identical to the case of systolic dysfunction (pulmonary edema in left heart failure, peripheral edema in right heart failure).

Diastolic dysfunction can be caused by processes similar to those that cause systolic dysfunction, particularly causes that affect cardiac remodeling.

Diastolic dysfunction may not manifest itself except in physiologic extremes if systolic function is preserved. The patient may be completely asymptomatic at rest. However, they are exquisitely sensitive to increases in heart rate, and sudden bouts of tachycardia (which can be caused simply by physiological responses to exertion, fever, or dehydration, or by pathological tachyarrhythmias such as atrial fibrillation with rapid ventricular response) may result in flash pulmonary edema. Adequate rate control (usually with a pharmacological agent that slows down AV conduction such as a calcium channel blocker or a beta-blocker) is, therefore, of key importance to preventing acute decompensation.

Left ventricular diastolic function can be determined through echocardiography by measurement of various parameters such as the E/A ratio (early-to-atrial left ventricular filling ratio), the E (early left ventricular filling) deceleration time, and the isovolumic relaxation time.
