= Pressure–volume loop analysis in cardiology =

Method of analysing cardiac performance

A plot of a system's pressure versus volume has long been used to measure the work done by the system and its efficiency. This analysis can be applied to heat engines and pumps, including the heart. A considerable amount of information on cardiac performance can be determined from the pressure vs. volume plot (pressure–volume diagram). A number of methods have been determined for measuring PV-loop values experimentally.

== Cardiac pressure–volume loops ==
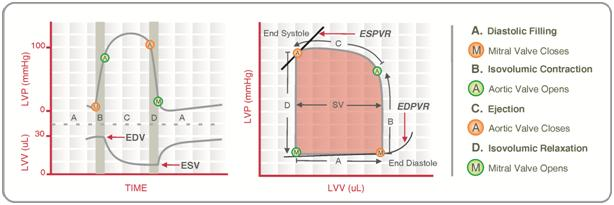
Figure 1: Idealized pressure–volume diagram featuring cardiac cycle components.

Real-time left ventricular (LV) pressure–volume loops provide a framework for understanding cardiac mechanics in experimental animals and humans. Such loops can be generated by real-time measurement of pressure and volume within the left ventricle. Several physiologically relevant hemodynamic parameters such as stroke volume, cardiac output, ejection fraction, myocardial contractility, etc. can be determined from these loops.

To generate a PV loop for the left ventricle, the LV pressure is plotted against LV volume at multiple time points during a single cardiac cycle.

== Cardiac terminology ==
=== Afterload ===
Afterload is the mean tension produced by a chamber of the heart in order to contract. It can also be considered as the ‘load’ that the heart must eject blood against. Afterload is, therefore, a consequence of aortic large vessel compliance, wave reflection, and small vessel resistance (LV afterload) or similar pulmonary artery parameters (RV afterload).

Left ventricular afterload is affected by various disease conditions. Hypertension increases the afterload, since the LV has to work harder to overcome the elevated arterial peripheral resistance and decreased compliance. Aortic valve diseases like aortic stenosis and insufficiency also increase the afterload, whereas mitral valve regurgitation decreases the afterload.

=== Preload ===
Preload is described as the stretching of a single cardiac myocyte immediately prior to contraction and is, therefore, related to the sarcomere length. Since sarcomere length cannot be determined in the intact heart, other indices of preload such as ventricular end-diastolic volume or pressure are used.

As an example, preload increases when venous return is increased. This is because the end-diastolic pressure and volume of the ventricle are increased, which stretches the sarcomeres. Preload can be calculated as

$$\text{preload} = \frac{\text{LVEDP} \times \text{LVEDR}}{2\text{h}}$$

where

- LVEDP = left ventricular end-diastolic pressure
- LVEDR = left ventricular end-diastolic radius (at midpoint of ventricle)
- h = thickness of ventricle

== Pressure–volume parameters ==
=== Stroke volume ===
Stroke volume (SV) is the volume of blood ejected by the right/left ventricle in a single contraction. It is the difference between the end-diastolic volume (EDV) and the end-systolic volume (ESV).

In mathematical terms, $\text{SV} = \text{EDV} - \text{ESV}$

The stroke volume is affected by changes in preload, afterload, and inotropy (contractility). In normal hearts, the SV is not strongly influenced by afterload, whereas, in failing hearts, the SV is highly sensitive to afterload changes. Stroke volume relative to EDV is Ejection Fraction.

=== Stroke work ===
Ventricular stroke work (SW) is defined as the work performed by the left or right ventricle to eject the stroke volume into the aorta or pulmonary artery, respectively. The area enclosed by the PV loop is a measure of the ventricular stroke work, which is a product of the stroke volume and the mean aortic or pulmonary artery pressure (afterload), depending on whether one is considering the left or the right ventricle.

=== Cardiac output ===
Cardiac output (CO) is defined as the amount of blood pumped by the ventricle in unit time.

In mathematical terms, $\text{CO} = \text{SV} \times \text{Heart Rate}$.

CO is an indicator of how well the heart is performing its function of transporting blood to deliver oxygen, nutrients, and chemicals to various cells of the body and to remove the cellular wastes. CO is regulated principally by the demand for oxygen by the cells of the body.

==== Physiologic relevance ====
Diseases of the cardiovascular system, such as hypertension and heart failure, are often associated with changes in CO. Cardiomyopathy and heart failure cause a reduction in cardiac output, whereas infection and sepsis are known to increase cardiac output. Hence, the ability to accurately measure CO is important in physiology, as it provides for improved diagnosis of abnormalities, and can be used to guide the development of new treatment strategies. However, CO is dependent upon loading conditions and is inferior to hemodynamic parameters defined by the PV plane. Further reading: Bramwel's book of physiology

=== Ejection fraction ===
Ejection fraction (EF) is defined as the fraction of end-diastolic volume that is ejected out of the ventricle during each contraction.

In mathematical terms, $\text{EF} = \frac{\text{SV}}{\text{EDV}}$

Healthy ventricles typically have ejection fractions greater than 0.55. However, EF is also dependent on loading conditions and inferior to hemodynamic parameters defined by the PV plane.

==== Physiologic relevance ====
Myocardial infarction or cardiomyopathy causes damage to the myocardium, which impairs the heart's ability to eject blood and, therefore, reduces ejection fraction. This reduction in the ejection fraction can manifest itself as heart failure.

Low EF usually indicates systolic dysfunction, and severe heart failure can result in EF lower than 0.2. EF is also used as a clinical indicator of the inotropy (contractility) of the heart. Increasing inotropy leads to an increase in EF, whereas decreasing inotropy decreases EF.

=== dP/dt_{min} & dP/dt_{max} ===
These represent the minimum and maximum rate of pressure change in the ventricle. Peak dP/dt has historically been used as an index of ventricular performance. However, it is known to be load-dependent and inferior to hemodynamic parameters defined by the PV plane.

An increase in contractility is manifested as an increase in dP/dt_{max} during isovolumic contraction. However, dP/dt_{max} is also influenced by preload, afterload, heart rate, and myocardial hypertrophy. Hence, the relationship between ventricular end-diastolic volume and dP/dt is a more accurate index of contractility than dP/dt alone.

Likewise, an increase in diastolic function or an increase in relaxation (lusitropy) causes increased dP/dt_{min} during isovolumic relaxation. Hence, dP/dt_{min} has been used as a valuable tool in the analysis of isovolumic relaxation. However, studies have shown that this parameter may not be a valid measure of LV relaxation rate, especially during acute alterations in contractility or afterload.

=== Isovolumic relaxation constant (Τau) ===
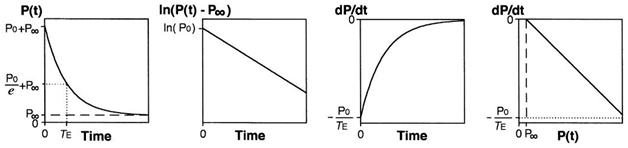
Figure 2. Calculation of Tau (Glantz method)

Tau represents the exponential decay of the ventricular pressure during isovolumic relaxation. Several studies have shown that Tau is a preload-independent measure of isovolumic relaxation.

The accurate estimation of Tau is highly dependent on the accuracy of ventricular pressure measurements. Thus, high fidelity pressure transducers are required to obtain real time instantaneous ventricular pressures.

Calculation of Tau (Glantz method)

$\text{P}(\text{t}) = \text{P}_0 e^{\frac{-\text{t}}{\tau_E}} + \text{P}_{\alpha}$

where

- P = pressure at time t
- P_{0} = amplitude constant
- τ_{E} = Glantz relaxation constant
- P_{α} = non zero asymptote due to pleural and pericardial pressure

== PV loop analysis ==
Due to the load dependency of the previous parameters, more accurate measures of ventricular function are available in the PV plane.

=== End-systolic pressure volume relationship ===
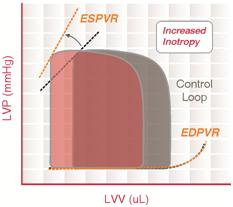
Pressure-Volume loops showing end-systolic pressure volume relationship

End-systolic pressure volume relationship (ESPVR) describes the maximal pressure that can be developed by the ventricle at any given LV volume. This implies that the PV loop cannot cross over the line defining ESPVR for any given contractile state.

The slope of ESPVR (Ees) represents the end-systolic elastance, which provides an index of myocardial contractility. The ESPVR is relatively insensitive to changes in preload, afterload, and heart rate. This makes it an improved index of systolic function over other hemodynamic parameters like ejection fraction, cardiac output, and stroke volume.

The ESPVR becomes steeper and shifts to the left as inotropy (contractility) increases. The ESPVR becomes flatter and shifts to the right as inotropy decreases.

=== End-diastolic pressure volume relationship ===
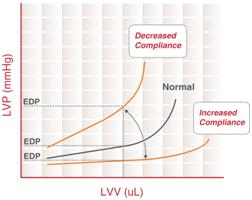
End-diastolic pressure volume relationship.

End-diastolic pressure volume relationship (EDPVR) describes the passive filling curve for the ventricle and thus the passive properties of the myocardium. The slope of the EDPVR at any point along this curve is the reciprocal of ventricular compliance (or ventricular stiffness).

For example, if ventricular compliance is decreased (such as in ventricular hypertrophy), the ventricle is stiffer. This results in higher ventricular end-diastolic pressures (EDP) at any given end-diastolic volume (EDV). Alternatively, for a given EDP, a less compliant ventricle would have a smaller EDV due to impaired filling.

If ventricular compliance increases (such as in dilated cardiomyopathy where the ventricle becomes highly dilated without appreciable thickening of the wall), the EDV may be very high but the EDP may not be greatly elevated.

=== Pressure-volume area ===
The Pressure-volume area (PVA) represents the total mechanical energy generated by ventricular contraction. This is equal to the sum of the stroke work (SW), encompassed within the PV loop, and the elastic potential energy (PE).

In mathematical terms, $\text{PVA} = \text{PE} + \text{SW}$

also,

$\text{PE} = \frac{\text{PES}(\text{VES} - \text{V}_0)}{2} - \frac{\text{PED}(\text{VED} - \text{V}_0)}{4}$

where

- PES = end-systolic pressure
- PED = end-diastolic pressure
- VES = end-systolic volume
- VED = end-diastolic volume
- V_{0} – theoretical volume when no pressure is generated

==== Physiologic relevance ====
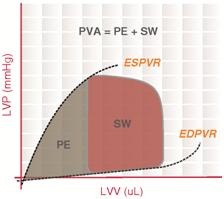
Pressure-volume area plot.

There is a highly linear correlation between the PVA and cardiac oxygen consumption per beat. This relationship holds true under a variety of loading and contractile conditions. This estimation of myocardial oxygen consumption (MVO_{2}) is used to study the coupling of mechanical work and the energy requirement of the heart in various disease states, such as diabetes, ventricular hypertrophy, and heart failure. MVO_{2} is also used in the calculation of cardiac efficiency, which is the ratio of cardiac stroke work to MVO_{2}.

=== Preload recruitable stroke work ===
Preload recruitable stroke work (PRSW) is determined by the linear regression of stroke work with the end-diastolic volume. The slope of the PRSW relationship is a highly linear index of myocardial contractility that is insensitive to preload and afterload.

==== Physiologic relevance ====
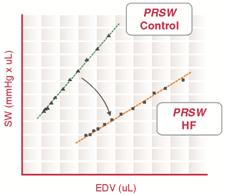
Preload recruitable stroke work.

During heart failure, myocardial contractility is reduced, which decreases the slope of the PRSW relationship. Recent studies also indicate that the volume axis intercept of the PRSW relationship (not the slope) may be a better indicator of the severity of contractile dysfunction.

=== Frank–Starling curve ===
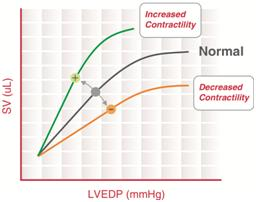
Frank–Starling curve.

“The heart will pump what it receives”- Starling’s law of the heart

The Frank–Starling mechanism describes the ability of the heart to change its force of contraction (and, hence, stroke volume) in response to changes in venous return. In other words, if the end-diastolic volume increases, there is a corresponding increase in stroke volume.

The Frank–Starling mechanism can be explained on the basis of preload. As the heart fills with more blood than usual, there is an increase in the load experienced by each myocyte. This stretches the muscle fibers, increasing the affinity of troponin C to Ca^{2+} ions, causing a greater number of cross-bridges to form within the muscle fibers. This increases the contractile force of the cardiac muscle, resulting in increased stroke volume.

Frank–Starling curves can be used as an indicator of muscle contractility (inotropy). However, there is no single Frank–Starling curve on which the ventricle operates but rather a family of curves, each of which defined by the afterload and inotropic state of the heart. Increased afterload or decreased inotropy shifts the curve down and to the right. Decreased afterload and increased inotropy shifts the curve up and to the left.

=== Arterial elastance ===
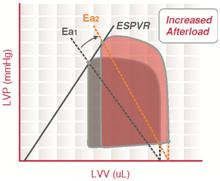
Arterial elastance

Arterial elastance (Ea) is a measure of arterial load and is calculated as the simple ratio of ventricular end-systolic pressure to stroke volume.

In mathematical terms, $\text{E}_\text{a} = \frac{\text{ESP}}{\text{SV}} = \text{Heart Rate} \times \text{Resistance}$

By characterizing both the ventricular and arterial systems in terms of pressure and stroke volume, it is possible to study the ventriculo-arterial coupling (the interaction between the heart and the arterial system).

== PV loop changes for diverse cardiac abnormalities ==
=== Dilated cardiomyopathy ===
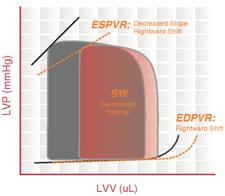
Dilated Cardiomyopathy

In dilated cardiomyopathy, the ventricle becomes dilated without compensatory thickening of the wall. The LV is unable to pump enough blood to meet the metabolic demands of the organism.

The end-systolic and diastolic volumes increase and the pressures remain relatively unchanged. The ESPVR and EDPVR curves are shifted to the right.

=== Left ventricular hypertrophy ===
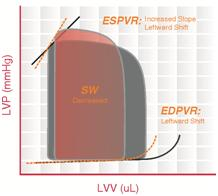
Left Ventricular Hypertrophy

Left ventricular hypertrophy (LVH) is an increase in the thickness and mass of the myocardium. This could be a normal reversible response to cardiovascular conditioning (athletic heart) or an abnormal irreversible response to chronically increased volume load (preload) or increased pressure load (afterload). Shown is a diagram of pathological hypertrophy reducing EDV and SV.

The thickening of the ventricular muscle results in decreased chamber compliance. As a result, LV pressures are elevated, the ESV is increased, and the EDV is decreased, causing an overall reduction in cardiac output.

There are two exceptions to this. Increased left ventricular hypertrophy with increased EDV and SV is seen with athletes and in healthy normal elderly individuals. Moderate hypertrophy allows for a lower heart rate, increased diastolic volume, and thus higher stroke volume.

=== Restrictive cardiomyopathy ===
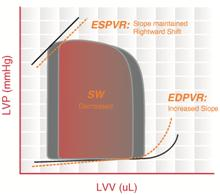
Restrictive cardiomyopathy

Restrictive cardiomyopathy includes a group of heart disorders in which the walls of the ventricles become stiff (but not necessarily thickened) and resist normal filling with blood between heartbeats.

This condition occurs when heart muscle is gradually infiltrated or replaced by scar tissue or when abnormal substances accumulate in the heart muscle. The ventricular systolic pressure remains normal, diastolic pressure is elevated and the cardiac output is reduced.

=== Valve diseases ===
==== Aortic stenosis ====
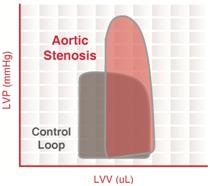
Aortic stenosis

Aortic valve stenosis is abnormal narrowing of the aortic valve. This results in much greater LV pressures than the aortic pressures during LV ejection. The magnitude of the pressure gradient is determined by the severity of the stenosis and the flow rate across the valve.

Severe aortic stenosis results in

1. reduced ventricular stroke volume due to increased afterload (which decreases ejection velocity)
2. increased end-systolic volume
3. compensatory increase in end-diastolic volume and pressure

==== Mitral stenosis ====
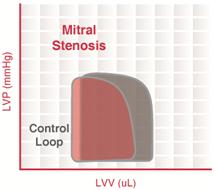
Mitral stenosis

This is a narrowing of the mitral valve orifice when the valve is open. Mitral stenosis impairs LV filling so that there is a decrease in end-diastolic volume (preload). This leads to a decrease in stroke volume by the Frank–Starling mechanism and a fall in cardiac output and aortic pressure. This reduction in afterload (in particular, aortic diastolic pressure) enables the end-systolic volume to decrease slightly but not enough to overcome the decline in end-diastolic volume. Therefore, because end-diastolic volume decreases more than end-systolic volume decreases, the stroke volume decreases.

==== Aortic regurgitation ====
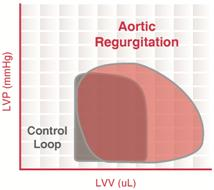
Aortic regurgitation

Aortic insufficiency (AI) is a condition in which the aortic valve fails to close completely at the end of systolic ejection, causing leakage of blood back through the valve during LV diastole.

The constant backflow of blood through the leaky aortic valve implies that there is no true phase of isovolumic relaxation. The LV volume is greatly increased due to the enhanced ventricular filling.

When the LV begins to contract and develop pressure, blood is still entering the LV from the aorta (since aortic pressure is higher than LV pressure), implying that there is no true isovolumic contraction. Once the LV pressure exceeds the aortic diastolic pressure, the LV begins to eject blood into the aorta.

The increased end-diastolic volume (increased preload) activates the Frank–Starling mechanism to increase the force of contraction, LV systolic pressure, and stroke volume.

==== Mitral regurgitation ====
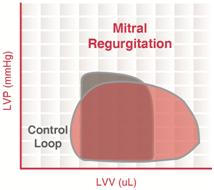
Mitral regurgitation

Mitral regurgitation (MR) occurs when the mitral valve fails to close completely, causing blood to flow back into the left atrium during ventricular systole.

The constant backflow of blood through the leaky mitral valve implies that there is no true phase of isovolumic contraction. Since the afterload imposed on the ventricle is reduced, end-systolic volume can be smaller than normal.

There is also no true period of isovolumic relaxation because some LV blood flows back into the left atrium through the leaky mitral valve. During ventricular diastolic filling, the elevated atrial pressure is transmitted to the LV during filling so that LV end-diastolic volume (and pressure) increases. This would cause the afterload to increase if it were not for the reduced outflow resistance (due to mitral regurgitation) that tends to decrease afterload during ejection. The net effect of these changes is that the width of the PV loop is increased (i.e., ventricular stroke volume is increased). However, ejection into the aorta (forward flow) is reduced. The increased ventricular stroke volume in this case includes the volume of blood ejected into the aorta as well as the volume ejected back into the left atrium.

== See also ==
- Cardiovascular System Dynamics Society
- Pressure–volume diagram
- Pressure–volume loop experiments
