= Anrep effect =

The Anrep effect describes the rapid increase in myocardial contractility in response to the sudden rise in afterload, the pressure the heart must work against to eject blood. This adaptive mechanism allows the heart to sustain stroke volume and cardiac output despite increased resistance. It operates through homeometric autoregulation, meaning that contractility adjustments occur independently of preload (the initial stretch of the heart muscle) or heart rate.

The Anrep effect is characterized by a two-step elevation in myocardial contractility, in response to elevated afterload, involving two distinct mechanistic phases: a primary, rapid rise in contractility driven by sarcomeric strain sensing, and a secondary, sustained phase of contraction mediated by post-translational modifications of contractile proteins. First described by Gleb von Anrep in 1912 and further elaborated in the 1960s by Sarnoff et al., the Anrep effect represents a distinct cardiac regulation mechanism, differing fundamentally from the Frank-Starling mechanism, the slow force response, and the Gregg effect.

While traditionally considered a short-term adaptation, recent studies suggest that the Anrep effect may also occur in chronic conditions involving persistent afterload elevation, such as hypertrophic obstructive cardiomyopathy.

== Distinguishing the Anrep effect from related cardiac mechanisms ==
The heart adjusts its pumping efficiency through changes in muscle length and load. When the cardiac muscle is stretched, it triggers a biphasic rise in force generation. The initial phase, governed by the Frank-Starling law (heterometric autoregulation), results in an immediate increase in contractile strength due to increased end-diastolic volume. This adjustment helps balance cardiac output with changes in filling pressure. The second phase, termed the slow force response, unfolds over several minutes, reflecting a sustained increase in contractility when preload remains constant following the initial stretch. In contrast, the Anrep effect (homeometric autoregulation) enhances ventricular contractility in response to acute afterload elevation, independent of preload or heart rate variations. The Anrep effect is often confused with other regulatory processes (e.g., the slow force response, the Gregg phenomenon) but has unique, very distinct, characteristics:

=== Frank-Starling mechanism ===
The Frank-Starling mechanism describes how increased preload (ventricular filling) stretches cardiac muscle fibers, enhancing stroke work through length-dependent activation of the myofilaments. This process aligns actin and myosin filaments for efficient cross-bridge formation while also recruiting myosin heads from dormant states into contraction-ready configurations. Additionally, stretching the sarcomeres sensitizes the thin (actin) filaments to calcium, promoting stronger and more sustained contractions. By contrast, the Anrep effect occurs at constant preload, triggered solely by afterload. It is characterized by increased contractility (steeper end-systolic pressure-volume relationship) and higher stroke work, without changes in stroke volume or end-diastolic volume.

=== Slow force response ===
This stretch-related (preload) response involves a gradual rise in contractility over several minutes (from 2 to 15 minutes, depending on species and experimental conditions) due to stretch-activated ion channels and G-protein-coupled receptors. It is mediated by angiotensin II and endothelin-1, which increase intracellular sodium and calcium concentrations through sodium-calcium exchangers. In contrast, the afterload-dependent response of the Anrep effect is initiated in milliseconds and concludes within 10 seconds, bypassing extracellular calcium regulation through the slow force response. Additionally, streptomycin, an inhibitor of stretch-activated ion channels, blocks the slow force response but does not affect the Anrep effect, reinforcing that the two mechanisms operate through distinct pathways.

=== Gregg Effect ===
This effect describes increased contractility due to improved coronary perfusion. It originates from changes in microvascular volume that trigger stretch-activated ion channels, resulting in increased intracellular calcium transient. The Gregg phenomenon generally begins to affect contractility approximately 5 seconds after onset, reaching peak force development within 40 seconds of sustained perfusion. However, the Anrep effect persists even in denervated, isolated hearts with constant coronary flow, eliminating perfusion-based explanations. Like the slow force response, the Gregg effect is sensitive to streptomycin, while the Anrep effect remains unaffected.

== Mechanistic basis of the Anrep effect ==
The activation of the Anrep effect involves recruiting a significant portion of dormant myosin motors within cardiomyocytes, as most myosin heads in each heart cell remain in a resting state. This recruitment transitions myosin from its inactive configuration to a contraction-ready state through a biphasic activation process that increases contractility in response to the afterload, and consequently elevates energy consumption:

=== Immediate (rapid) phase: myofilament strain-sensitive activation ===
- An acute rise in afterload increases ventricular wall tension, activating resting myosin heads due to afterload-dependent mechanosensing. This transition involves super-relaxed state myosin shifting into the contraction-ready state (i.e, disorder-relaxed), allowing myosin to bind to actin and form force-generating cross-bridges.

=== Sustained phase: post-translational modifications ===
- Persistent afterload triggers oxidative stress, activating calcium/calmodulin-dependent protein kinase II. Myosin light chain 2 and cardiac myosin-binding protein C are phosphorylated, strengthening myosin-actin cross-bridge formation and prolonging systolic ejection time to maintain stroke volume.

== Hemodynamic description ==
The Anrep effect can be understood in terms of its hemodynamic impact on the heart during afterload increases:

1. Elevated afterload: reflected by increased effective arterial elastance and ventricular end-systolic pressure.
2. Enhanced myocardial contractility: demonstrated by a leftward shift and steepening of the end-systolic pressure-volume relationship, along with a higher maximum rate of pressure rise (dP/dtmax).
3. Prolonged systole: represented by a longer systolic ejection time due to sustained activation of contractile elements.

These responses ensure the heart maintains stroke volume and cardiac output, despite increased afterload, at the cost of higher energy consumption.

== Historical perspective ==
The Anrep effect was first described by Gleb von Anrep in 1912 during experiments involving splanchnic nerve stimulation in dogs. He observed that stimulating the splanchnic nerve caused peripheral vasoconstriction, which increased blood pressure and afterload. In response, cardiac contractility increased, a phenomenon Anrep attributed to the release of adrenaline from the suprarenal glands, independent of preload changes. Later, Ernest Starling suggested that enhanced coronary flow, improving myocardial nourishment (a concept later termed the Gregg effect), might explain the increase in contractility observed by von Anrep. However, both historical and recent research has demonstrated that the Anrep effect arises from an intrinsic property of the myocardium, independent of adrenaline release or coronary flow. In the mid-20th century, Sarnoff et al. introduced the term homeometric autoregulation to describe the heart's ability to augment contractility in response to elevated afterload, independent of preload or hormonal stimulation. This concept distinguished the Anrep effect from the Frank-Starling law, which involves heterometric autoregulation, where increased preload enhances contractility by stretching myocardial fibers. Despite Sarnoff's clarification, some of his experiments reported a brief, transient increase in preload following afterload elevation. He dismissed this effect as non-essential for triggering the Anrep effect, yet this observation led to persistent confusion. To this day, some studies mistakenly associate the Anrep effect with the slow force response, despite clear differences in their underlying physiology.

== Clinical implications ==
Although originally considered an acute and transient response, recent research suggests that the Anrep effect may persist in chronic conditions involving sustained afterload increases. One example is hypertrophic obstructive cardiomyopathy, where left ventricular outflow tract obstruction results in persistent afterload elevation, potentially activating the Anrep effect chronically. Understanding this mechanism has important implications for cardiac physiology, heart failure management, and therapeutic interventions targeting afterload reduction.
