= Cardiovascular physiology =

Cardiovascular physiology is the study of the cardiovascular system, specifically addressing the physiology of the heart ("cardio") and blood vessels ("vascular").

These subjects are sometimes addressed separately, under the names cardiac physiology and circulatory physiology.

Although the different aspects of cardiovascular physiology are closely interrelated, the subject is still usually divided into several subtopics.

== Heart ==
- Cardiac output (= heart rate * stroke volume. Can also be calculated with Fick principle, palpating method.)
  - Stroke volume (= end-diastolic volume − end-systolic volume)
  - Ejection fraction (= stroke volume / end-diastolic volume)
  - Cardiac output is mathematically ` to systole
  - Inotropic, chronotropic, and dromotropic states
  - Cardiac input (= heart rate * suction volume Can be calculated by inverting terms in Fick principle)
  - Suction volume (= end-systolic volume + end-diastolic volume)
  - Injection fraction (=suction volume / end-systolic volume)
  - Cardiac input is mathematically ` to diastole
- Electrical conduction system of the heart
  - Electrocardiogram
  - Cardiac marker
  - Cardiac action potential
- Frank–Starling law of the heart
- Wiggers diagram
- Pressure volume diagram

== Regulation of blood pressure ==
- Baroreceptor
- Baroreflex
- Renin–angiotensin system
  - Renin
  - Angiotensin
- Juxtaglomerular apparatus
- Aortic body and carotid body
- Autoregulation
  - Cerebral Autoregulation

=== Hemodynamics ===
Under most circumstances, the body attempts to maintain a steady mean arterial pressure.

When there is a major and immediate decrease (such as that due to hemorrhage or standing up), the body can increase the following:

- Heart rate
- Total peripheral resistance (primarily due to vasoconstriction of arteries)
- Inotropic state

In turn, this can have a significant impact upon several other variables:

- Stroke volume
- Cardiac output
- Pressure
  - Pulse pressure (systolic pressure - diastolic pressure)
  - Mean arterial pressure (usually approximated with diastolic pressure + 1/3 pulse pressure)
  - Central venous pressure

== Regional circulation ==
Name of circulation	% of cardiac output	Autoregulation	Perfusion	Comments
pulmonary circulation	100% (deoxygenated)			Vasoconstriction in response to hypoxia
cerebral circulation	15%	high	under-perfused	Fixed volume means intolerance of high pressure. Minimal ability to use anaerobic respiration
coronary circulation	5%	high	under-perfused	Minimal ability to use anaerobic respiration. Blood flow through the left coronary artery is at a maximum during diastole (in contrast to the rest of systemic circulation, which has a maximum blood flow during systole.)
splanchnic circulation	15%	low		Flow increases during digestion.
hepatic circulation	15%			Part of portal venous system, so oncotic pressure is very low
renal circulation	25%	high	over-perfused	Maintains glomerular filtration rate
skeletal muscular circulation	17%			Perfusion increases dramatically during exercise.
cutaneous circulation	2%		over-perfused	Crucial in thermoregulation. Significant ability to use anaerobic respiration

== See also ==
- Cardiovascular System Dynamics Society
