= Hibernating myocardium =

Cardiac muscle abnormality

In cardiology, hibernating myocardium is a state when some segments of the myocardium exhibit abnormalities of contractile function. These abnormalities can be visualised with echocardiography, cardiac magnetic resonance imaging (CMR), nuclear medicine (PET) or ventriculography. Echocardiography: A wall motion abnormality at rest which improves during a low-dose dobutamine stress test is classified as "hibernating myocardium." Low dose dobutamine stimulates contractile function and thus helps to predict functional recovery after revascularization. Cardiac magnetic resonance: The most frequently used MR contrast agents based on Gd-chelates accumulate in the extracellular space which is increased in scarred myocardium. This leads to a signal increase which can be visualised with the "late gadolinium enhancement technique." This is probably the most accurate way to visualise scarred myocardium. An alternative (or additional) technique with CMR is the use of low dose dobutamine similar to echocardiography. PET: The finding of a perfusion or metabolic mismatch between PET-FDG and PET-NH_{3} is indicative of decreased metabolism. The wall of the affected segments is hypo-, a-, or dyskinetic.

The phenomenon is highly significant clinically because it usually manifests itself in the setting of chronic ischemia, that is potentially reversible by revascularisation via cardiac catheterization. The regions of myocardium are still viable and can return to normal function. There develops a new steady state between myocardial blood flow (MBF) and myocardial function, MBF reduced and in consequence function is reduced too. The clinical situations where one can expect hibernating myocardium are:

- chronic stable angina
- unstable angina
- silent ischemia
- after AMI

== See also ==
- Stunned myocardium
- Myocardial scarring
