= Myocardial stunning =

- Other names: transient post-ischemic myocardial dysfunction
- Specialty: Cardiology
- Complications: Takotsubo cardiomyopathy
- Differential diagnosis: hibernating myocardium, silent ischemia, myocardial infarction, acute pericarditis, myocarditis, pulmonary embolism

Myocardial stunning or transient post-ischemic myocardial dysfunction is a state of mechanical cardiac dysfunction that can occur in a portion of myocardium without necrosis after a brief interruption in perfusion, despite the timely restoration of normal coronary blood flow. In this situation, even after ischemia has been relieved (by for instance angioplasty or coronary artery bypass surgery) and myocardial blood flow (MBF) returns to normal, myocardial function is still depressed for a variable period of time, usually days to weeks. This reversible reduction of function of heart contraction after reperfusion is not accounted for by tissue damage or reduced blood flow, but rather, its thought to represent a perfusion-contraction "mismatch". Myocardial stunning was first described in laboratory canine experiments in the 1970s where LV wall abnormalities were observed following coronary artery occlusion and subsequent reperfusion.

== Cause ==
Clinical situations associated with myocardial stunning include:

- acute myocardial infarction (AMI) with early reperfusion
- unstable angina
- after percutaneous transluminal coronary angioplasty (PTCA)
- after cardiac surgery
- 'neurogenic' stunned myocardium following an acute cerebrovascular event such as a subarachnoid hemorrhage
- in patients undergoing chronic hemodialysis, chronic myocardial stunning may lead to heart failure

Myocardial stunning has been implicated in the development of Takotsubo (Stress) cardiomyopathy.

== Pathophysiology ==
The underlying mechanisms of myocardial stunning have remained the subject of debate for several decades. Two leading hypotheses implicate reperfusion-induced oxygen free-radical damage and altered calcium flux resulting in intracellular hypercalcemia and desensitization of myofilaments. After total ischemia occurs, the myocardium switches immediately from aerobic glycolysis to anaerobic glycolysis resulting in the reduced ability to produce high energy phosphates such as ATP and Creatinine Phosphate. At this point, the lack of the energy and lactate accumulation results in cessation of contraction within 60 seconds of ischemia (i.e. Vessel Occlusion). Subsequent to this is a period of "myocardial stunning," in which reversible ischemic damage is taking place. At approximately 30 minutes after the onset of total ischemia the damage becomes irreversible, thereby ending the phase of myocardial stunning. The generation of oxygen-derived [free radicals] during the initial period of reperfusion after ischemia is believed to contribute to the pathogenesis of myocardial stunning.

Some evidence suggests that brief, repetitive episodes of myocardial ischemia may result in chronic myocardial stunning and ventricular contractile impairment.

== Diagnosis ==
Imaging techniques such as echocardiography, ventriculography, and nuclear imaging can be used to detect a contractile dysfunction following reperfusion after an episode of ischemia. The area of dysfunction should also maintain normal perfusion, detected via Positron Emission Tomography, echocardiography with contrast, and/or thallium scintigraphy in order for a diagnosis of myocardial stunning to be considered. However, there are many practical challenges to diagnosing myocardial stunning using these methods. Accurate detection of regional myocardial blood flow and contraction function abnormalities must be detected at levels of high sensitivity. The diagnosis of myocardial stunning must also be differentiated from other conditions such as hibernating myocardium and persistent (silent) subendocardial ischemia, which can also co-exist with superimposed stunning.

== Management ==
Treatment considerations for myocardial stunning should be determined based on the clinical judgment of the cardiologist or physician, the degree of LV impairment and symptoms, and the wishes of the person.

Some evidence supports the use of inotropic drugs in the case of severe myocardial dysfunction.

Results from canine experimental trials investigating the oxygen free-radical hypothesis for myocardial stunning have shown a reduction in free radical generation and improvement in myocardial function following anti-oxidant infusion.
