= Admittance and conductance in cardiac performance =

- Purpose: determine the instantaneous volume of the ventricle

There is an established practice of using the electrical conductance of blood (PV loops) in heart ventricles to determine the instantaneous volume of the ventricle. This technique involves inserting a tetra-polar catheter into the ventricle and measuring conductance. This measured conductance is a combination of blood and muscle and various techniques are used to identify the blood conductance from the total measured conductance. Blood conductance can then be converted to volume using a linear (Baan) or a non-linear (Wei) relationship that relates conductance to volume.

== Traditional conductance technology ==
This approach is based on the idea that the total conductance, G, of a fluid between two electrodes is a function of the fluid's conductivity (reciprocal of resistivity) and volume.

In cardiology, a tetra-polar catheter is inserted into the ventricle and a constant current (I) is applied across the two outer electrodes. This generates an electrical field within the ventricle and the two inner electrodes measure a voltage generated due to the electric field. This measured voltage (V) is used to determine conductance through a modified version of Ohm's law. Conductance (G) is the reciprocal of resistance (R) which changes the standard Ohm's equation from V=IR to V=I/G.

Conductance is then related to blood volume though Baan's equation. When used in cardiology, the electric field generated is not limited to the blood (the fluid of interest) but also penetrates the heart wall, giving rise to additional conductance often called "parallel conductance" or "muscle conductance", G_{m} which must be removed.

Various techniques have been attempted to remove the G_{m} contribution with varying degrees of success. The most common method is the hypertonic saline technique which involves injecting a bolus of hypertonic saline into the ventricle to alter blood conductivity without affecting the surrounding muscle. Another less commonly used technique involves evacuating the ventricle of blood and measuring muscle conductance alone with a conductance catheter. Clearly both techniques are unreliable, somewhat invasive and fail to account for the continuous variation in G_{m} over the cardiac cycle.

== Improved admittance technology ==
The Admittance technique is an improvement over the Conductance technique for the real-time removal of muscle conductance G_{m}. Blood and muscle respond to alternating (AC) electrical currents very differently. Blood is purely resistive while muscle has both resistive and capacitive properties. The fixed charges in muscle cells create a significant reactance that causes a phase shift (time delay) in the measured signal, relative to the excitation signal. Admittance technology uses this phase shift to determine the instantaneous muscle conductance and remove it from the total measured conductance.

=== Removal of G_{m} ===
The total Admittance (Y), of the blood filled ventricle is given by Y = G_{b} + G_{m} + iωC_{m} where:

- G_{b} is the measured conductance of the blood (the desired signal)
- G_{m} is the measured conductance of the cardiac muscle (unwanted signal)
- C_{m} is the measured capacitance of the cardiac muscle
- ω is the angular frequency of the excitation signal

The signals G_{m} and C_{m} are both properties of cardiac muscle and vary in a fixed ratio. Thus the ratio of G_{m} to C_{m} is equal to the ratio of muscle conductivity (σ) to muscle permittivity (ε). The ratio σ/ε is the constant of proportionality. Although both σ and ε are functions of the health of the heart tissue, they are relatively constant for short periods of time.

Using this proportionality, one can rewrite the equation for G_{m} as G_{m} = (σ/ε)C_{m}

Note that the imaginary component of Y depends only on the amount of muscle in the field of the catheter. This makes it easy to isolate by measuring the phase shift, φ, of the measured signal:
cos(φ) = (G_{b} + G_{m})/Y
sin(φ) = ωC_{m}/Y
Hence, C_{m} = Y.sin(φ)/ω
also, G_{m} = (σ/ε)C_{m}

Thus, blood conductance is determined as G_{b} = Y.cos(φ) - G_{m}

Wei's equations can be applied to this calculated blood conductance G_{b} to obtain blood volume. Unlike Baan's equation, Wei's equation takes into account the non-linear nature of the electrical field and the dynamic nature of the cardiac cycle to give a more accurate representation of the blood volume.

== Experimental results ==
Admittance technique involves the measurement of both phase angle and total conductance in the ventricle. Thus, it is possible to observe how the parallel conductance (muscle conductance) varies throughout the cardiac cycle. A plot showing both the blood and muscle contribution are shown in the figure.
