= Heart failure with reduced ejection fraction =

Medical condition

- HFrEF is known as a "systolic dysfunction" due to reduced pumping function from the left ventricle. EF less than or equal to 40 percent is indicative of poor pumping function.
- Specialty: Cardiology

Heart failure with reduced ejection fraction (HFrEF, hef-REF) is a form of heart failure in which the ejection fraction is reduced. This is defined as a left ventricular ejection fraction (LVEF) of 40% or less. About half of heart failure patients have a reduced ejection fraction. Other types of heart failure are heart failure with mildly reduced ejection fraction (HFmrEF, LVEF between 40% and 50%) and heart failure with preserved ejection fraction (HFpEF, LVEF 50% or higher).

== Signs and symptoms ==
HFrEF may result in a variety of signs and symptoms, though these are non-specific, so their presence cannot confirm that a person has HFrEF. The most typical symptoms are shortness of breath, orthopnea (shortness of breath when lying flat), paroxysmal nocturnal dyspnea (shortness of breath and coughing at night), fatigue, and reduced exercise tolerance, and ankle swelling (peripheral edema). The most specific signs, those which are most likely to indicate HFrEF as opposed to other conditions, are high jugular venous pressure (often marked by visibly distended jugular veins) and positive abdominojugular test, a third heart sound, and an apex beat farther to the side of the body than normal.

== Epidemiology ==
Heart failure is a growing disease that accounts for an estimated 1 million hospitalizations in the U.S. alone. Heart failure with reduced ejection fraction (HFrEF) accounts for about half of those hospitalizations. The increased prevalence of obesity and diabetes no doubt has increased the prevalence of HFrEF. Increased survival due to advances in interventional therapy for myocardial infarctions and other cardiovascular diseases has also lead to an increased prevalence of heart disease and heart failure. At the end of the day, the upward trend we see from year to year reflects an aging patient population.

== Diagnosis ==
Coronary angiogram
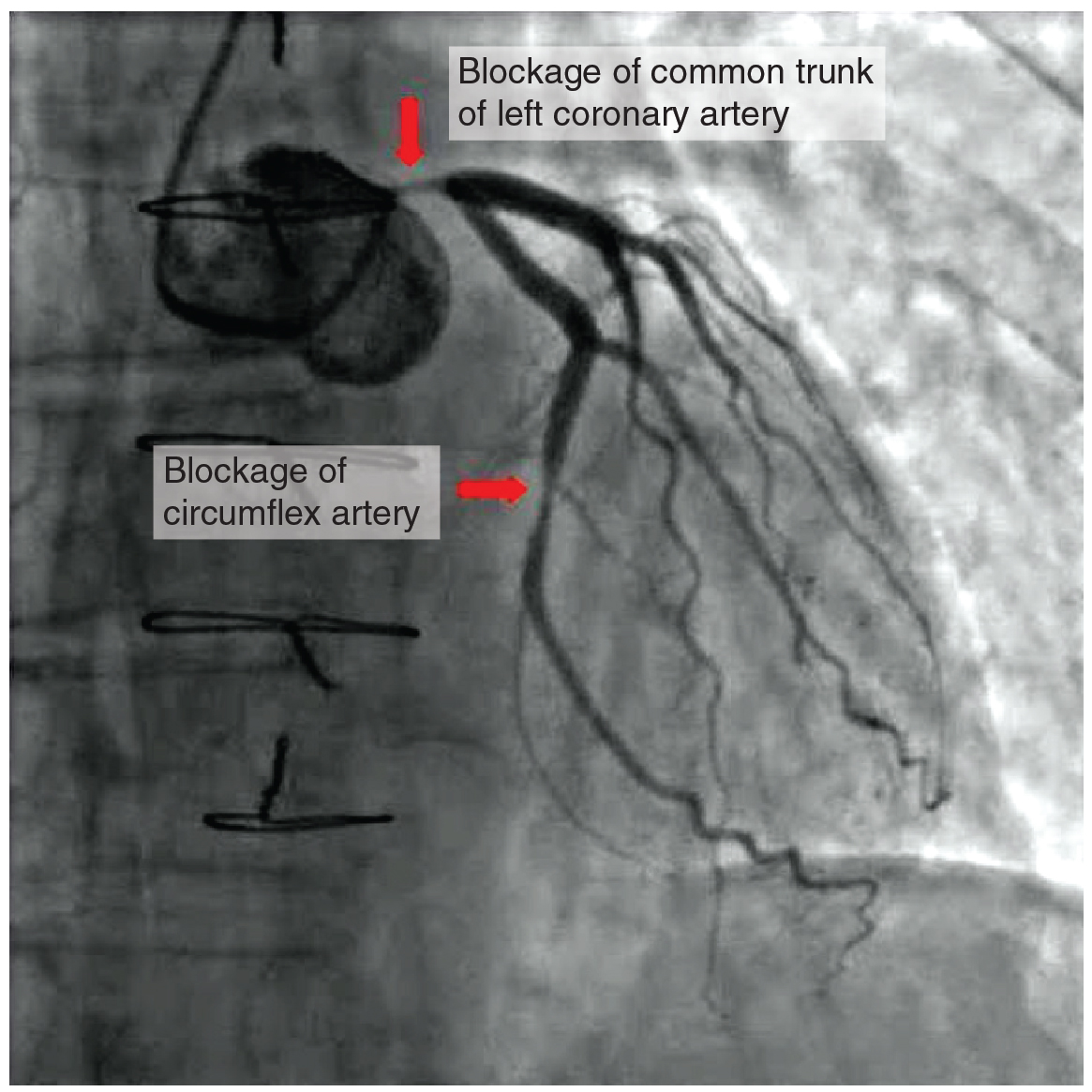
- Coronary angiogram is the gold standard used by many physicians to visualize obstructive coronary artery disease. It provides the highest sensitivity and specificity when compared to other screening tools.

When it comes to diagnosing HFrEF, the first step is identifying the signs and symptoms associated with heart failure. If the diagnosis of HFrEF is highly suspicious, there are many studies that can be ordered to confirm the diagnosis. The most important initial testing involves obtaining an echocardiogram, measuring natriuretic peptides, and obtaining a chest x-ray. An echocardiogram, specifically a trans-thoracic echocardiogram (TTE), can help establish the pumping function (systolic function) of the heart. This helps physicians calculate the ejection fraction (EF) of the heart and EF less than or equal to 40% is a sign of poor systolic function. Natriuretic peptides are elevated when fluid is overloaded in the cardiovascular system. A chest x-ray can be very helpful to identify signs of congestion and heart failure.

Patients with a new diagnosis of HFrEF often require ischemic workup. Around half of new HFrEF cases are due to undiagnosed coronary artery disease (CAD). Coronary angiography is the gold standard test to identify the extent of obstructive coronary artery disease. Other less invasive tests include CT angiogram, stress testing, and nuclear cardiac imaging.

== Treatment ==
Guideline-directed medical therapy (GDMT) for HFrEF involve modulation of multiple mechanisms to decrease both morbidity and mortality for patients. One of the main therapies is targeted at inhibition of the angiotensin-renin-aldosterone system (ACE-inhibitors, ARNI, ARB) to help decrease cardiac work and promote cardiac remodeling. Beta-blockers also help decrease sympathetic activity in the heart which leads to less cardiac work and better outcomes long term. Mineralocorticoid receptor antagonists (MRA) are also a major component of GDMT because they improve symptoms while also promoting cardiac remodeling. Newest addition to GDMT are sodium-glucose co-transporter 2 inhibitors (SGLT-2) due to their ability to improve prognosis in patients with HFrEF regardless of their diabetes status. The mechanism of how SGLT-2 inhibitors improve HFrEF prognosis is still unknown. The popular theory is that they improve myocardial metabolism, fibrosis, vascular function, and inflammation which can help decrease both mortality and morbidity. Lastly diuretics are also commonly prescribed to patients with HFrEF; however, studies show that their benefit is limited to symptom relief rather than a decrease in overall mortality.
