= Ventriculography =

Ventriculography may refer to:

- Cerebral ventriculography
- Cardiac ventriculography
