= Takotsubo cardiomyopathy =

Sudden temporary weakening of the heart muscle

- Other names: Transient apical ballooning syndrome, apical ballooning cardiomyopathy, stress-induced cardiomyopathy, broken-heart syndrome, Gebrochenes-Herz syndrome
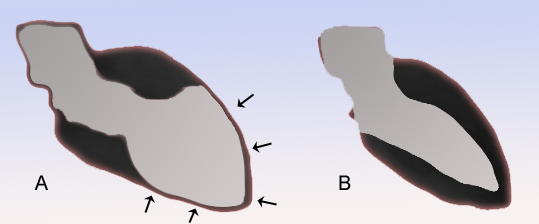
- Schematic representation of cardiomyopathy (A) compared to a normal heart (B)
- Specialty: Cardiology
- Duration: Typically a few days, up to a few months
- Risk factors: Physical stress (e.g., sepsis, chemotherapy), psychological stress (e.g., loss of employment, sudden loss of relationship, grief, anxiety), genetic predisposition
- Prognosis: Good

Takotsubo cardiomyopathy or takotsubo syndrome (TTS), also known as stress cardiomyopathy, is a type of non-ischemic cardiomyopathy in which there is a sudden temporary weakening of the muscular portion of the heart. It usually appears after a significant stressor, either physical or emotional; when caused by the latter, the condition is sometimes called broken heart syndrome.

Examples of physical stressors that can cause TTS are sepsis, shock, subarachnoid hemorrhage, and pheochromocytoma. Emotional stressors include bereavement, divorce, or the loss of a job. Reviews suggest that of patients diagnosed with the condition, about 70–80% recently experienced a major stressor, including 41–50% with a physical stressor and 26–30% with an emotional stressor. TTS can also appear in patients who have not experienced major stressors.

The pathophysiology is not well understood, but a sudden massive surge of catecholamines such as adrenaline and noradrenaline from extreme stress or a tumor secreting these chemicals is thought to play a central role. Excess catecholamines, when released directly by nerves that stimulate cardiac muscle cells, have a toxic effect and can lead to decreased cardiac muscular function or "stunning". Further, this adrenaline surge triggers the arteries to tighten, thereby raising blood pressure and placing more stress on the heart, and may lead to spasm of the coronary arteries that supply blood to the heart muscle. This impairs the arteries from delivering adequate blood flow and oxygen to the heart muscle. Together, these events can lead to congestive heart failure and decrease the heart's output of blood with each squeeze.

Takotsubo cardiomyopathy occurs worldwide. The condition is thought to be responsible for 2% of all acute coronary syndrome cases presenting to hospitals. Although TTS has generally been considered a self-limiting disease, spontaneously resolving over the course of days to weeks, contemporary observations show that "a subset of TTS patients may present with symptoms arising from its complications, e.g. heart failure, pulmonary edema, stroke, cardiogenic shock, or cardiac arrest". This does not imply that rates of shock/death of TTS are comparable to those of acute coronary syndrome, but that patients with acute complications may co-occur with TTS. These cases of shock and death have been associated with the occurrence of TTS secondary to an inciting physical stressor such as hemorrhage, brain injury sepsis, pulmonary embolism or severe chronic obstructive pulmonary disease (COPD).

It occurs more commonly in postmenopausal women.

== Signs and symptoms ==
The typical presentation of takotsubo cardiomyopathy is chest pain with or without shortness of breath and associated electrocardiogram (ECG) changes mimicking an anterior wall myocardial infarction. During the course of evaluation of the patient, a bulging out of the left ventricular apex with a hypercontractile base of the left ventricle is often noted. It is the hallmark bulging-out of the apex of the heart with preserved function of the base that earned the syndrome the name takotsubo ("octopus trap") in Japan, where it was first described.

Stress is the main factor in takotsubo cardiomyopathy, with more than 85% of cases set in motion by either a physically or emotionally stressful event that prefaces the start of symptoms. Acute asthma, surgery, subarachnoid hemorrhage, chemotherapy, and stroke are examples of physical stressors. In a few cases, the stress may be a happy event.

== Risk factors ==
=== Stress trigger ===
Although there have been documented cases of TTS without a triggering stressor, it is widely recognized that TTS is preceded by a stressful or emotional event. Case series looking at large groups of patients report that some patients develop takotsubo cardiomyopathy after experiencing emotional stress. Some patients have a preceding clinical stressor (such as a brain injury, asthma attack or exacerbation of a chronic illness) and research has indicated that this type of stress may even occur more often than emotionally stressful triggers. Roughly one-third of patients have no preceding stressful event. A 2009 large case series from Europe found that takotsubo cardiomyopathy was slightly more frequent during the winter season. This may be related to two possible/suspected pathophysiological causes: coronary spasms of microvessels, which are more prevalent in cold weather, and viral infections – such as Parvovirus B19 – which occur more frequently during the winter.

=== Gender ===
Postmenopausal women are at greatest risk of developing TTS. This has led some researchers to theorize about the possible protective effects of estrogen in preventing TTS.

=== Genetic risk factors ===
As of 2014 it is being investigated whether certain genetic traits associated with catecholamine receptors found on cardiac muscle cells play a role in the development of TTS. There is limited evidence tying TTS directly to a specific genetic expression or mutation, however there is a widely held hypothesis supporting the idea of the interaction between environmental factors and the interplay of genetic predisposition leading to the susceptibility to microvascular alterations that contribute to the TTS disease process.

=== Hormonal dysregulation ===
Certain endocrine diseases including pheochromocytoma and thyrotoxicosis have been identified as potential risk factors for TTS. The relationship between thyroid function and stress cardiomyopathy is marked by a dual phenotype, where both impending primary hyperthyroidism and a high set point of thyroid homeostasis (encoding type 2 allostatic load) are common phenomena. A multi-centre observation study found normal thyroid function to be the exception rather than the rule in TTS. Especially hyperthyroidism is highly prevalent in takotsubo cardiomyopathy, and it seems to predict a poor prognosis in terms of complications and mortality. This observation was confirmed by results of the international GEIST registry, which demonstrated that thyrotoxicosis is associated with significantly increased fatality, whereas hypothyroidism indicates a better survival.

== Pathophysiology ==
The cause of takotsubo cardiomyopathy is not fully understood, but several mechanisms have been proposed. It is well documented that elevated catecholamine levels have been implicated in the vast majority of TTS cases. Theories suggest a link between brain activation of stress-related biochemicals (including neuropeptides) and the effects these chemicals have on areas of the heart, especially neuropeptide Y. Specifically, adrenal stimulation by the sympathetic nervous system has been seen in cases ranging from physical events such as ischemic stroke, to emotional events such as depression or loss of a loved-one. How these increased levels of catecholamines act in the body to produce the changes seen with TTS is not clearly understood. Research supports the widely-held theory that microvascular dysfunction and coronary vasospasm caused by a rapid influx of catecholamines to cardiac myocytes, results in apical stunning and transient cardiomyopathy.

1. Microvascular dysfunction/Transient vasospasm: Some of the original researchers of takotsubo suggested that multiple simultaneous spasms of coronary arteries could cause enough loss of blood flow to cause transient stunning of the myocardium. Other researchers have shown that vasospasm is much less common than earlier thought. It has been observed that vasospasms, even in multiple arteries, do not correlate with the areas of myocardium that are not contracting. However, coronary artery vasospasm is still believed to contribute to the TTS disease process. The theory of vasospasm is not easily distinguished from microvascular dysfunction, and microvascular dysfunction could explain vasospasticity. Impaired microvascular function is seen in a vast majority, if not all, of patients with TTS and is one of the most widely held theories. Most of the dysfunction occurs from abnormalities within the endothelial linings of blood vessels supplying the heart. In TTS, these highly sensitive interior linings of the vessels have reduced functionality which create dysregulation of vascular tone and predispose the individual to vasoconstriction. When the increased vasoconstriction from catecholamines occurs, the result is acute cardiac ischemia.
2. Catecholamine-induced myocyte injury: It has been suggested that the response to catecholamines (such as epinephrine and norepinephrine, released in response to stress) leads to heart muscle dysfunction that contributes to takotsubo cardiomyopathy. The effects of this toxicity can be greater in those with a predisposition to anxiety or panic disorders. Delivery of catecholamines (epinephrine, norepinephrine) via circulating blood and through direct delivery from cardiac nerves is increased by the stimulation of stress control centers of the brain. During an emotionally or physically stressful event, brain centers initiate the sympathetic nervous pathways and increase myocardial activity. Excessive catecholamine stimulation has a toxic effect on cardiac muscle cells which creates necrosis of the contractile units of cells similarly seen during acute myocardial infarction. The increased workload of cardiac muscle created by the stimulation of catecholamines, increases the need for more blood and oxygen to these muscles to sustain function. When these demands are unable to be met, the heart is starved of blood and oxygen and begins to die. Included in the cytotoxic sequela of catecholamine toxicity is the molecular transformation of the cardiac myocyte to produce apical stunning.
3. Mid-ventricular and left ventricular outflow obstruction: It has been suggested that a mid-ventricular wall thickening with outflow obstruction is important in the pathophysiology. A quarter of unselected patients with TTS who presented to an emergency department were found to have obstructive hypertrophic cardiomyopathy (HCM) on blinded echocardiographic analysis. These patients had septal thickening, systolic anterior motion (SAM) of the mitral valve, left ventricular outflow tract (LVOT) obstruction with mean peak outflow gradients of 71 ±40mmHg. Compared with normal controls, the patients with SAM had longer anterior mitral leaflets, thicker septum (16 ±4 mm), and anterior displacement of the mitral valve in LV cavity. Moreover, in the patients with SAM, distinctive characteristics of HCM, including the mitral valve abnormalities persisted after normalization of LV function. It had previously been hypothesized that LVOT obstruction was due to a geometric shape-change of the LV caused by ballooning. In contrast, this data and others indicate that SAM and the outflow obstruction, rather are the cause of the LV ballooning in these patients. Patients with obstructive HCM may develop acute LV ballooning that resembles TTS when latent obstruction becomes severe and unrelenting. This observation has supplemented previous reports that acute LV ballooning punctuated the course of 1% of obstructive HCM patients, occurring even in recent clinical trials of pharmacologic agents. The cause is afterload mismatch and supply-demand ischemia that frequently cause striking cardiographic abnormalities when LVOT gradients are more than 60 mmHg. Contributing to ischemia are intramural coronary narrowings in HCM due to intimal and medial hyperplasia of the arterioles. Acute LV ballooning due to SAM and LVOT obstruction can cause cardiogenic shock. This complication may be severe enough to require mechanical LV support. If cardiogenic shock is refractory, with acidosis and oliguria, it may require surgical relief of LVOT obstruction. Strikingly, after outflow obstruction is relieved, LV function and hemodynamics return to normal within hours. This is compelling evidence that the HCM and LVOT obstruction was the cause of the acute LV ballooning. There may be different phenocopies of TTS. Individual cases, though appearing similar, may have different pathophysiology. The most common cause is thought to be a direct adverse effect on the cardiomyocytes and microvasculature that may be conceptualized as neurohumoral TTS. Another, occurring in a minority of TTS patients, is caused by acute LVOT obstruction with distinctive features of HCM. Both may be precipitated by acute emotional stress.
4. Apical stunning: This stunning is largely seen as a protective effect produced by the flood of excess catecholamines into the cardiac muscle cell. Overstimulation of catecholamine receptors create physiological changes in the receptor which has an inverse effect on cardiac cellular function. Termed 'cellular-trafficking', this property of the cardiac muscle cell is actually a molecular transformation of the cell to produce a down-regulation of catecolaminergic sensitivity. This means that in the presence of excess epinephrine, a normal cardiac contraction is inhibited in an effort to reduce energy demands, prevent hyperactivity and spare the integrity of the cell. Further bolstering this idea is the concentration of these kinds of receptors in the heart. Higher concentrations of the receptor effected to produce cardiac stunning are found closer to the apex of the ventricle. This is what creates the classic ballooning effect of the ventricle.

It is likely that there are multiple factors at play that could include some amount of vasospasm and failure of the microvasculature. These factors can overlap and create the complex sequela leading to ischemia and left ventricle contraction abnormality. For instance, estrogen, which confers protection to women by improving blood flow to heart muscle, is one biochemical pathway implicated in the TTS disease process. Once this protective mechanism is reduced through the decreased production of estrogen after menopause, there is thought to be an increase in endothelial dysfunction predisposing an individual to vasoconstriction and cardiac ischemia. An inciting stressful event elicits the release of catecholamines into the blood stream to create increased heart muscle activity and metabolism. This leads to further cardiac microvascular endothelial dysfunction through oxidative stress, alteration of ion-mediated channels, and electrolyte disturbances which ultimately alter myocardial cell membrane permeability and dysfunction. Coupled with direct heart muscle toxicity, this crescendo of factors are implicated in the ballooning and heart failure characteristically seen in TTS.

A 2019 case involved a 60-year-old woman presenting with TTS due to over-consumption of wasabi, mistaking it for avocado.

== Diagnosis ==
Several well regarded institutions of medical research have produced clinical criteria useful in diagnosing TTS. One of the first sets of guidelines was initially published in 2004 and again in 2008 by the Mayo Clinic. Other research institutions proposing diagnostic criteria include the Japanese Takotsubo Cardiomyopathy Study Group, University of Gothenburg, Johns Hopkins University, the Takotsubo Italian Network and the Heart Failure Associates TTS Taskforce of the European Society of Cardiology. All of the research institutions agree on at least two main criteria needed to accurately diagnose TTS: 1) transient left ventricular wall motion abnormality and 2) the absence of a condition obviously explaining this wall motion abnormality (coronary artery lesion, hypoperfusion, myocarditis, toxicity, etc.). Other commonly acknowledged criteria necessary for diagnosis include characteristic EKG changes and mild to modest elevation in cardiac troponin.

Transient apical ballooning syndrome or takotsubo cardiomyopathy is found in 1.7–2.2% of patients presenting with acute coronary syndrome. While the original case studies reported on individuals in Japan, takotsubo cardiomyopathy has been noted more recently in the United States and Western Europe. It is likely that the syndrome previously went undiagnosed before it was described in detail in the Japanese literature. Evaluation of individuals with takotsubo cardiomyopathy typically includes a coronary angiogram to rule out occlusion of the left anterior descending artery, which will not reveal any significant blockages that would cause the left ventricular dysfunction. Provided that the individual survives their initial presentation, the left ventricular function improves within two months.

The diagnosis of takotsubo cardiomyopathy may be difficult upon presentation. The ECG findings often are confused with those found during an acute anterior wall myocardial infarction. It classically mimics ST-segment elevation myocardial infarction, and is characterised by acute onset of transient ventricular apical wall motion abnormalities (ballooning) accompanied by chest pain, shortness of breath, ST-segment elevation, T-wave inversion or QT-interval prolongation on ECG. Cardiac enzymes are usually negative and are moderate at worst, and cardiac catheterization usually shows absence of significant coronary artery disease.

The diagnosis is made by the pathognomonic wall motion abnormalities, in which the base of the left ventricle is contracting normally or is hyperkinetic while the remainder of the left ventricle is akinetic or dyskinetic. This is accompanied by the lack of significant coronary artery disease that would explain the wall motion abnormalities. Although apical ballooning has been described classically as the angiographic manifestation of takotsubo, it has been shown that left ventricular dysfunction in this syndrome includes not only the classic apical ballooning, but also different angiographic morphologies such as mid-ventricular ballooning and, rarely, local ballooning of other segments.

The ballooning patterns were classified by Shimizu et al. as takotsubo type for apical akinesia and basal hyperkinesia, reverse takotsubo for basal akinesia and apical hyperkinesia, mid-ventricular type for mid-ventricular ballooning accompanied by basal and apical hyperkinesia, and localised type for any other segmental left ventricular ballooning with clinical characteristics of takotsubo-like left ventricular dysfunction.

In short, the main criteria for the diagnosis of takotsubo cardiomyopathy are: the patient must have experienced a stressor before the symptoms began to arise; the patient's ECG reading must show abnormalities from a normal heart; the patient must not show signs of coronary blockage or other common causes of heart troubles; the levels of cardiac enzymes in the heart must be elevated or irregular; and the patient must recover complete contraction and be functioning normally in a short amount of time.

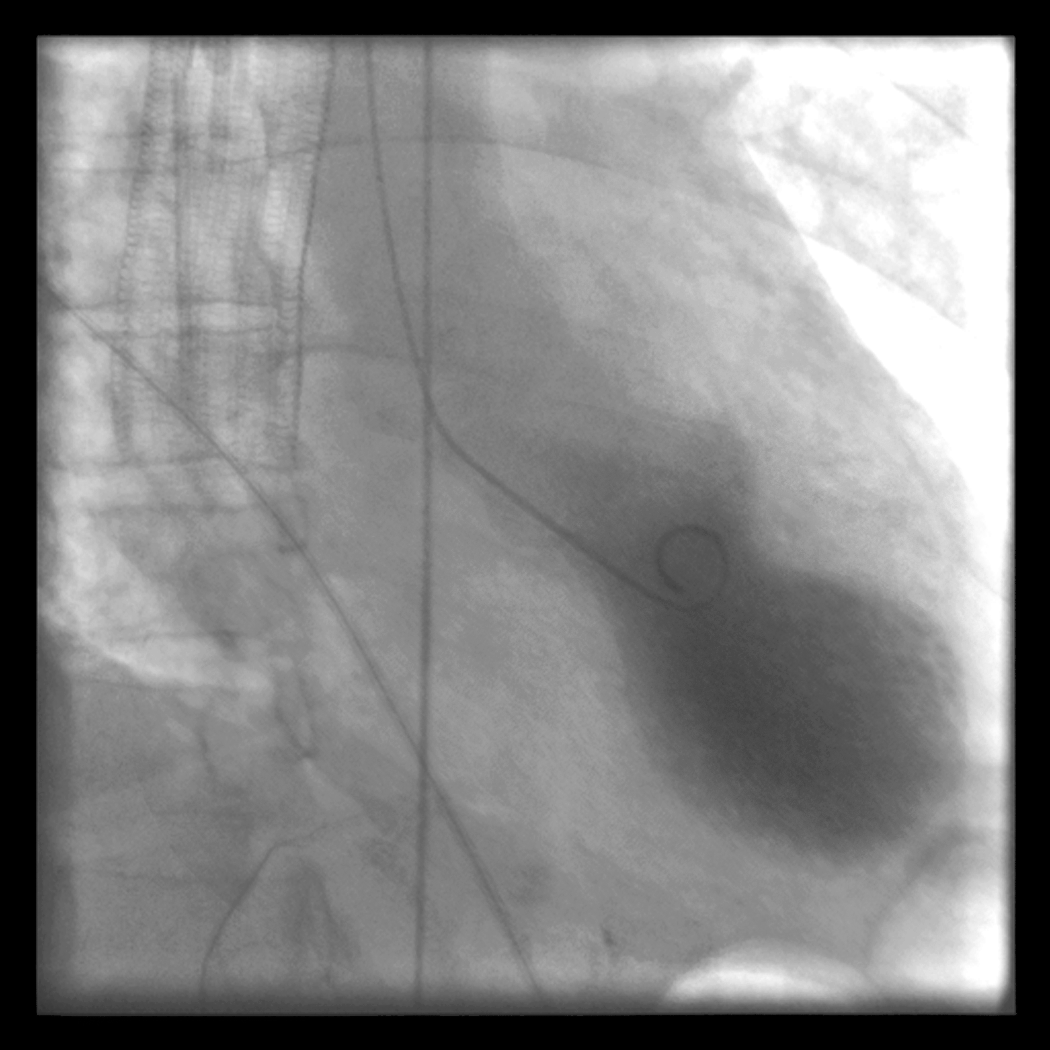
Left ventriculography during systole showing apical ballooning akinesis with basal hyperkinesis in a characteristic takotsubo ventricle

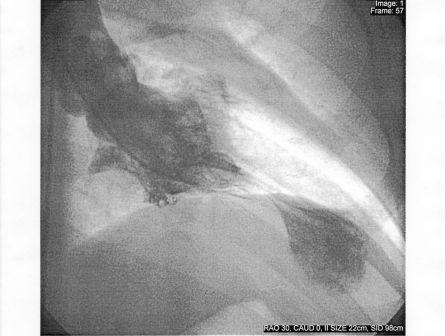
Left ventriculogram during systole displaying the characteristic apical ballooning with apical motionlessness in a patient with takotsubo cardiomyopathy

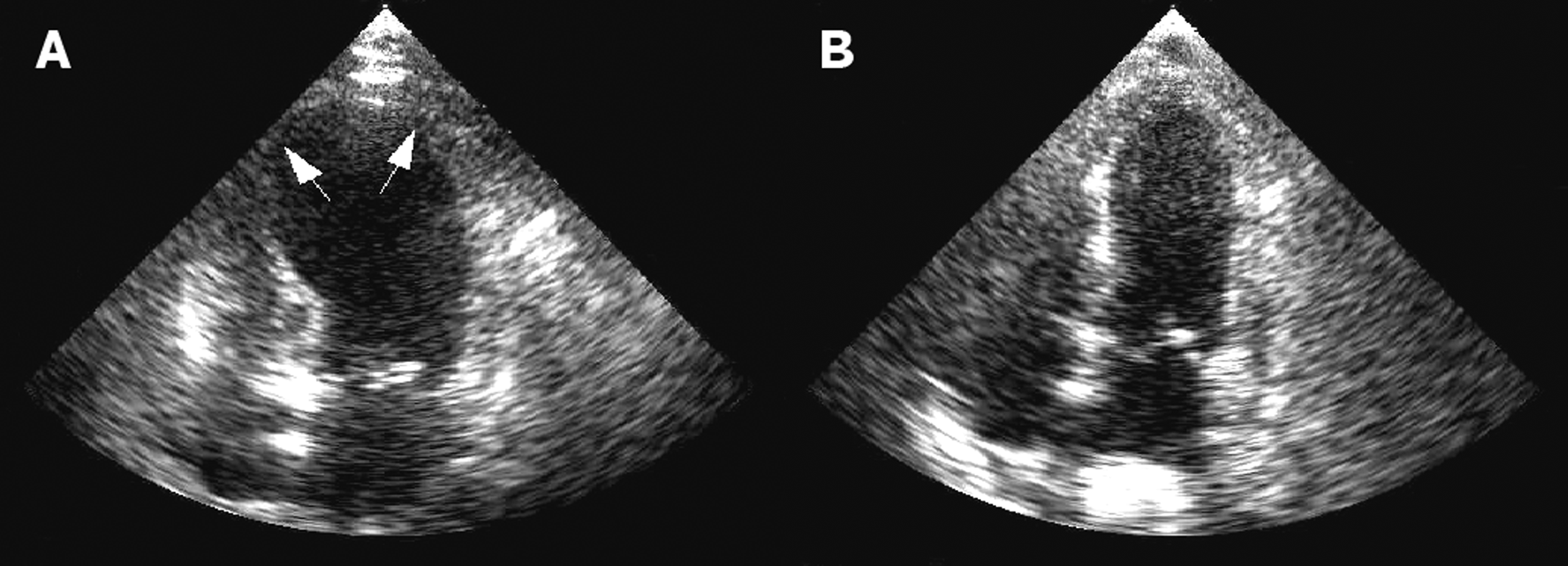
(A) Echocardiogram showing dilatation of the left ventricle in the acute phase (B) Resolution of left ventricular function on repeat echocardiogram six days later

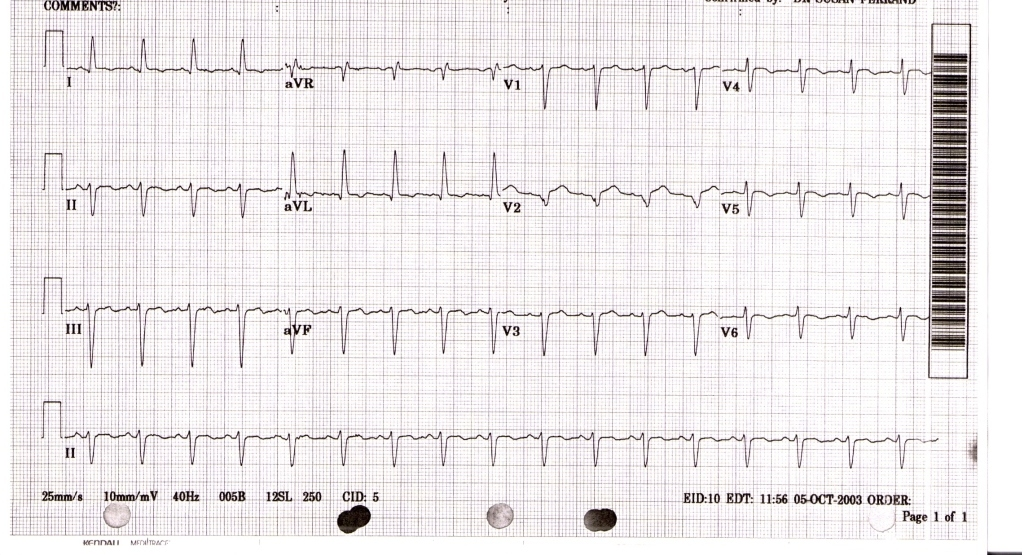
ECG showing sinus tachycardia and non-specific ST and T wave changes from a person with confirmed takotsubo cardiomyopathy

Echocardiogram showing the effects of the disease

== Treatment ==
The treatment of takotsubo cardiomyopathy is generally supportive in nature, for it is considered a transient disorder. Treatment is dependent on whether patients experience heart failure or acute hypotension and shock. In many individuals, left ventricular function normalizes within two months. Aspirin and other heart drugs also appear to help in the treatment of this disease, even in extreme cases. After the patient has been diagnosed, and myocardial infarction (heart attack) ruled out, the aspirin regimen may be discontinued, and treatment becomes that of support for the patient.

While medical treatments are important to address the acute symptoms of takotsubo cardiomyopathy, further treatment includes lifestyle changes. It is important that the individual stay physically healthy while learning and maintaining methods to manage stress, and to cope with future difficult situations.

Although the symptoms of takotsubo cardiomyopathy usually go away on their own and the condition completely resolves itself within a few weeks, some serious short and long-term complications can happen that must be treated. These most commonly include congestive heart failure and very low blood pressure, and less commonly include blood clotting in the apex of the left ventricle, irregular heart beat, and tearing of the heart wall.

=== Heart failure ===
For patients in acute heart failure, ACE inhibitors, angiotensin receptor blockers, and beta blockers, are considered mainstays of heart failure treatment. But use of beta blockers specifically for takotsubo cardiomyopathy is controversial, because they may confer no benefit.

=== Low blood pressure ===
For people with cardiogenic shock, medical treatment is based on whether a left ventricular outflow tract (LVOT) obstruction is present. Therefore, early echocardiography is necessary to determine proper management. For those with obstructed LVOTs inotropic agents should not be used, but instead should be managed like patients with hypertrophic cardiomyopathy, (e.g. phenylephrine and fluid resuscitation). For cases in which the LVOT is not obstructed, inotropic therapy (e.g. dobutamine and dopamine) may be used, but with the consideration that takotsubo is caused by excess catecholamines.

Furthermore, mechanical circulatory support (MCS) with an intra-aortic balloon pump (IABP) is well-established as supportive treatment.

== Prognosis ==
Despite the grave initial presentation in some of the patients, most of the patients survive the initial acute event, with a very low rate of in-hospital mortality or complications. Once a patient has recovered from the acute stage of the syndrome, they can expect a favorable outcome and the long-term prognosis is excellent for most. Even when ventricular systolic function is heavily compromised at presentation, it typically improves within the first few days and normalises within the first few months. Some people continue to experience shortness of breath during physical activity or chest discomfort even after the heart’s pumping function returns to normal. Although infrequent, recurrence of the syndrome has been reported and seems to be associated with the nature of the trigger. While men experience TTS at much lower rates than women, they also experience much higher rates of complication, reoccurrence, and mortality; the cause of this sex difference is still unknown, but it is hypothesized that the social aspect of the doctor-patient interaction affects the way that physicians recognize and generate individual treatment plans for men compared to women. Stress cardiomyopathy is now a well-recognized cause of acute congestive heart failure, lethal abnormal heart rhythms, and rupture of the heart wall.

== Epidemiology ==
Takotsubo syndrome represents about 2% of all patients (and 5–6% of all female patients) who are initially diagnosed with acute coronary syndrome (ACS). It accounts for 0.02% of all hospitalizations in the US. About 90% of TTS patients are women, whose mean age is about 68 years, and 80% of whom are older than 50 years. About 2.2% of TTS cases had the reversed (basal) variant. Recurrence rate of TTS is about 1.8% per-patient year.

There is a steady annual increase in takotsubo cardiomyopathy among both women and men from 2006 to 2017, with the sharpest increases among women 50 and older.

== History ==
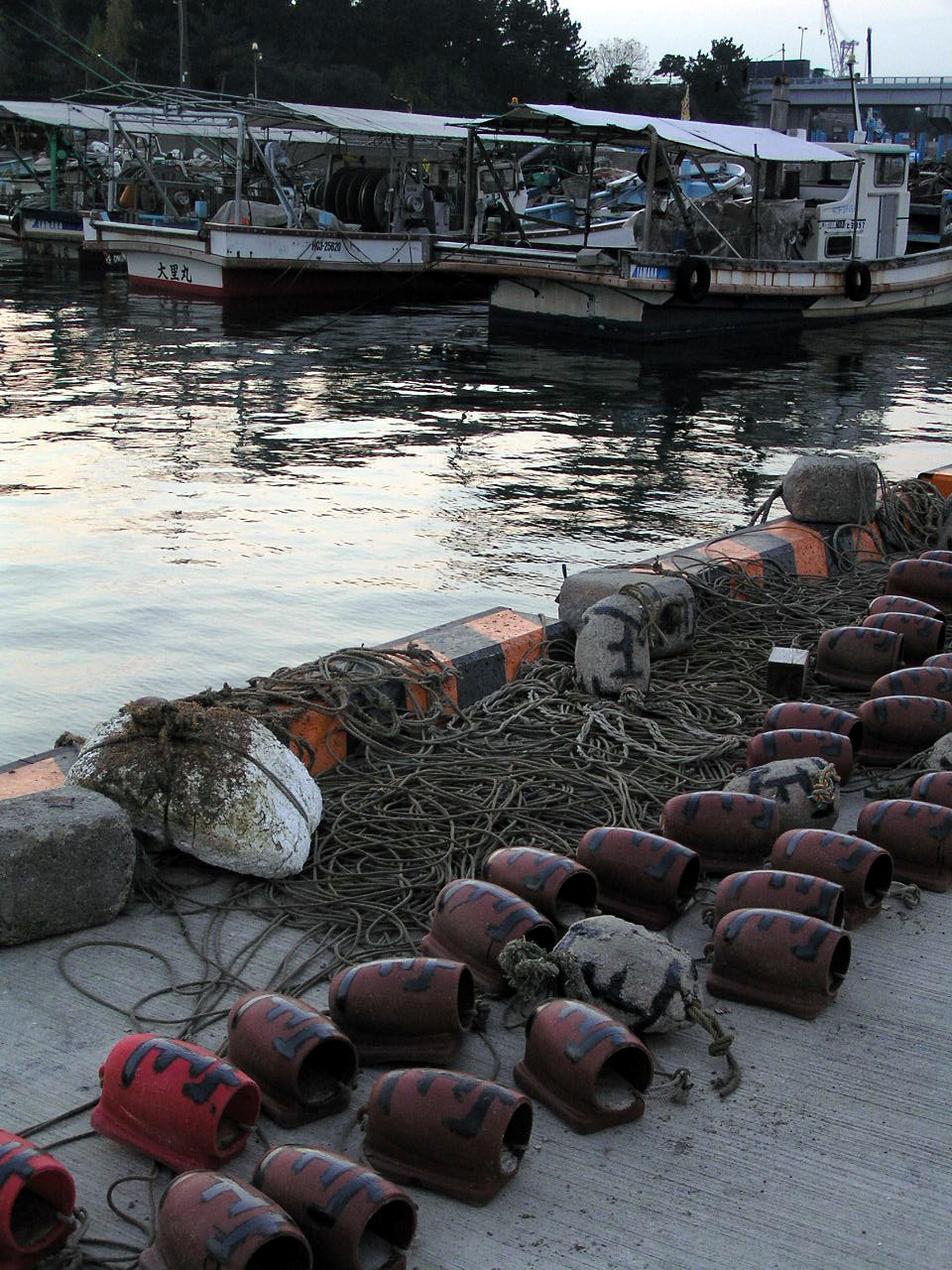
The Japanese octopus traps after which this disease is named

Rees, et al. wrote in 1967 that the death of a close relative increases the risk of dying within one year by a factor of seven.

Engel wrote about sudden and rapid death during psychological stress in 1971 and itemized 8 causation categories: (1) on the impact of the collapse or death of a close person; (2) during acute grief; (3) on threat of loss of a close person; (4) during mourning or on an anniversary; (5) on loss of status or self-esteem; (6) personal danger or threat of injury; (7) after the danger is over; (8) reunion, triumph, or happy ending. He proposed these events provoke neurovegetative responses, involving both the flight-fight and conservation-withdrawal systems, conducive to lethal cardiac events, particularly in individuals with preexisting cardiovascular disease.

Although the first scientific description of takotsubo cardiomyopathy was not until the 1990s, Cebelin and Hirsch wrote about human stress cardiomyopathy in 1980. The two looked at homicidal assaults that had happened in Cuyahoga County, Ohio, the past 30 years, specifically those with autopsies who had no internal injury, but had died of physical assault. They found that 11 of 15 had myofibrillar degeneration similar to animal stress studies. In the end, they concluded their data supported "the theory of catecholamine mediation of these myocardial changes in man and of the lethal potential of stress through its effect on the heart".

The syndrome was first named "takotsubo" by Japanese physician Hikaru Sato, who described "tako-tsubo-like left ventricular dysfunction" in a 1990 case study. The name comes from the Japanese word takotsubo (蛸壷, "octopus trap"), because when affected by this condition, the left ventricle of the heart takes on a shape resembling the round jar used for catching lobsters and octopuses.

The syndrome reached international audiences through the media in 2005 when the New England Journal of Medicine wrote about the syndrome.

== In popular culture ==
- In episode 11, Season 3 ("Words and Deeds", 2007) of the TV series House, firefighter Derek suffers from this syndrome.
- Appeared in episode 1 of season 1 of Astrid et Raphaëlle.
- The name and title track of the 2021 album Tako Tsubo by French band L'Impératrice refers to the intense emotional stress that may provoke this syndrome.

== See also ==
- Widowhood effect
