= End-systolic volume =

Measure of heart volume

End-systolic volume (ESV) is the volume of blood in a ventricle at the end of contraction, or systole, and the beginning of filling, or diastole.

ESV is the lowest volume of blood in the ventricle at any point in the cardiac cycle. The main factors that affect the end-systolic volume are afterload and the contractility of the heart.

== Uses ==
End systolic volume can be used clinically as a measurement of the adequacy of cardiac emptying, related to systolic function. On an electrocardiogram, or ECG, the end-systolic volume will be seen at the end of the T wave. Clinically, ESV can be measured using two-dimensional echocardiography, MRI (magnetic resonance tomography) or cardiac CT (computed tomography) or SPECT (single photon emission computed tomography).

== Sample values ==
Along with end-diastolic volume, ESV determines the stroke volume, or output of blood by the heart during a single phase of the cardiac cycle. The stroke volume is the difference between the end-diastolic volume and the end-systolic volume. The end-systolic values in the table below are for the left ventricle:

Ventricular volumes
Measure	Right ventricle	Left ventricle
End-diastolic volume	144 mL (± 23 mL)	142 mL (± 21 mL)
End-diastolic volume / body surface area (mL/m^{2})	78 mL/m^{2} (± 11 mL/m^{2})	78 mL/m^{2} (± 8.8 mL/m^{2})
End-systolic volume	50 mL (± 14 mL)	47 mL (± 10 mL)
End-systolic volume / body surface area (mL/m^{2})	27 mL/m^{2} (± 7 mL/m^{2})	26 mL/m^{2} (± 5.1 mL/m^{2})
Stroke volume	94 mL (± 15 mL)	95 mL (± 14 mL)
Stroke volume / body surface area (mL/m^{2})	51 mL/m^{2} (± 7 mL/m^{2})	52 mL/m^{2} (± 6.2 mL/m^{2})
Ejection fraction	66% (± 6%)	67% (± 4.6%)
Heart rate	60–100 bpm	60–100 bpm
Cardiac output	4.0–8.0 L/minute	4.0–8.0 L/minute

The right ventricular end-systolic volume (RVESV) normally ranges between 50 and 100 mL.
