= Ejection fraction =

Portion of blood pumped per heartbeat

An ejection fraction (EF) related to the heart is the volumetric fraction of blood ejected from a ventricle or atrium with each contraction (or heartbeat). An ejection fraction can also be used in relation to the gallbladder, or to the veins of the leg. Unspecified, it usually refers to the left ventricle of the heart. EF is widely used as a measure of the pumping efficiency of the heart and is used to classify heart failure types. It is also used as an indicator of the severity of heart failure, although it has recognized limitations.

The EF of the left heart, known as the left ventricular ejection fraction (LVEF), is calculated by dividing the volume of blood pumped from the left ventricle per beat (stroke volume) by the volume of blood present in the left ventricle at the end of diastolic filling (end-diastolic volume). LVEF is an indicator of the effectiveness of pumping into the systemic circulation. The EF of the right heart, or right ventricular ejection fraction (RVEF), is a measure of the efficiency of pumping into the pulmonary circulation. A heart which cannot pump sufficient blood to meet the body's requirements (i.e., heart failure) will often, but not always, have a reduced ventricular ejection fraction.

In heart failure, the difference between heart failure with reduced ejection fraction (HFrEF) and heart failure with preserved ejection fraction (HFpEF) is significant, because the two types are treated differently.

== Measurement ==
Modalities applied to measurement of ejection fraction is an emerging field of medical mathematics and subsequent computational applications. The first common measurement method is echocardiography, although cardiac magnetic resonance imaging (MRI), cardiac computed tomography, ventriculography and nuclear medicine (gated SPECT and radionuclide angiography) scans may also be used. Measurements by different modalities are not easily interchangeable. Historically, the gold standard for measurement of the ejection fraction was cardiac ventriculography, but cardiac MRI is now considered the best method. Prior to these more advanced techniques, the combination of electrocardiography and phonocardiography was used to accurately estimate ejection fraction.

== Physiology ==
=== Normal values ===
In a healthy 70-kilogram (150 lb) man, the stroke volume is approximately 70 mL, and the left ventricular end-diastolic volume (EDV) is approximately 120 mL, giving an estimated ejection fraction of 70/120, or 0.58 (58%). Healthy individuals typically have ejection fractions between 50% and 65%, although the lower limits of normality are difficult to establish with confidence.

Ventricular volumes
Measure	Right ventricle	Left ventricle
End-diastolic volume	144 mL (± 23 mL)	142 mL (± 21 mL)
End-diastolic volume / body surface area (mL/m^{2})	78 mL/m^{2} (± 11 mL/m^{2})	78 mL/m^{2} (± 8.8 mL/m^{2})
End-systolic volume	50 mL (± 14 mL)	47 mL (± 10 mL)
End-systolic volume / body surface area (mL/m^{2})	27 mL/m^{2} (± 7 mL/m^{2})	26 mL/m^{2} (± 5.1 mL/m^{2})
Stroke volume	94 mL (± 15 mL)	95 mL (± 14 mL)
Stroke volume / body surface area (mL/m^{2})	51 mL/m^{2} (± 7 mL/m^{2})	52 mL/m^{2} (± 6.2 mL/m^{2})
Ejection fraction	66% (± 6%)	67% (± 4.6%)
Heart rate	60–100 bpm	60–100 bpm
Cardiac output	4.0–8.0 L/minute	4.0–8.0 L/minute

== Pathophysiology ==
=== Heart failure categories ===
Damage to heart muscle (myocardium), such as occurring following myocardial infarction or cardiomyopathy, compromises the heart's performance as an efficient pump and may reduce ejection fraction. This broadly understood distinction marks an important determinant between ischemic vs. nonischemic heart failure. Such reduction in the EF can manifest itself as heart failure. The 2021 European Society of Cardiology guidelines for the diagnosis and treatment of acute and chronic heart failure subdivided heart failure into three categories on the basis of LVEF:

1. normal or preserved LVEF [≥50%] (HFpEF)
2. moderately reduced LVEF [in the range of 41–49%] (HFmrEF)
3. reduced LVEF [≤40%] (HFrEF)]

A chronically low ejection fraction less than 30% is an important threshold in qualification for disability benefits in the US.

== Calculation ==
By definition, the volume of blood within a ventricle at the end of diastole is the end-diastolic volume (EDV). Likewise, the volume of blood left in a ventricle at the end of systole (contraction) is the end-systolic volume (ESV). The difference between EDV and ESV is the stroke volume (SV). The ejection fraction is the fraction of the end-diastolic volume that is ejected with each beat; that is, it is stroke volume (SV) divided by end-diastolic volume (EDV):

$EF (\%) = \frac{SV}{EDV}\times100$

Where the stroke volume is given by:

$SV = EDV - ESV$

EF is inherently a relative measurement—as is any fraction, ratio, or percentage, whereas the stroke volume, end-diastolic volume or end-systolic volume are absolute measurements.

== History ==
William Harvey described the basic mechanism of the systemic circulation in his 1628 De motu cordis. It was initially assumed that the heart emptied completely during systole. However, in 1856 Chauveau and Faivre observed that some fluid remained in the heart after contraction. This was confirmed by Roy and Adami in 1888. In 1906, Henderson estimated the ratio of the volume discharged in systole to the total volume of the left ventricle to be approximately 2/3. In 1933, Gustav Nylin proposed that the ratio of the heart volume/stroke volume (the reciprocal of ejection fraction) could be used as a measure of cardiac function. In 1952, Bing and colleagues used a minor modification of Nylin's suggestion (EDV/SV) to assess right ventricular function using a dye dilution technique. Exactly when the relationship between end diastolic volume and stroke volume was inverted into its current form is unclear. Holt calculated the ratio SV/EDV and noted that '...The ventricle empties itself in a "fractional" manner, approximately 46 per cent of its end-diastolic volume being ejected with each stroke and 54 per cent remaining in the ventricle at the end of systole'.

In 1962, Folse and Braunwald used the ratio of forward stroke volume/EDV and observed that "estimations of the fraction of the left ventricular end-diastolic volume that is ejected into the aorta during each cardiac cycle, as well as of the ventricular end-diastolic and residual volumes, provide information that is fundamental to a hemodynamic analysis of left ventricular function". Elliott, Lane and Gorlin used the term "ejection fraction" in a conference paper abstract published in January 1964. In 1965, Bartle et al. used the term ejected fraction for the ratio SV/EDV, and the term ejection fraction was used in two review articles in 1968 suggesting a wide currency by that time.
