= End-diastolic volume =

Measurement of blood volume

In cardiovascular physiology, end-diastolic volume (EDV) is the volume of blood in the right or left ventricle at the end of filling during diastole, the relaxation phase of the cardiac cycle. Because greater EDVs cause greater distention of the ventricle, EDV is often used synonymously with preload, which refers to the length of the sarcomeres in cardiac muscle prior to contraction (systole). An increase in EDV increases the preload on the heart and, through the Frank-Starling mechanism of the heart, increases the amount of blood ejected from the ventricle during systole (stroke volume).

== Sample values ==
Ventricular volumes
Measure	Right ventricle	Left ventricle
End-diastolic volume	144 mL (± 23 mL)	142 mL (± 21 mL)
End-diastolic volume / body surface area (mL/m^{2})	78 mL/m^{2} (± 11 mL/m^{2})	78 mL/m^{2} (± 8.8 mL/m^{2})
End-systolic volume	50 mL (± 14 mL)	47 mL (± 10 mL)
End-systolic volume / body surface area (mL/m^{2})	27 mL/m^{2} (± 7 mL/m^{2})	26 mL/m^{2} (± 5.1 mL/m^{2})
Stroke volume	94 mL (± 15 mL)	95 mL (± 14 mL)
Stroke volume / body surface area (mL/m^{2})	51 mL/m^{2} (± 7 mL/m^{2})	52 mL/m^{2} (± 6.2 mL/m^{2})
Ejection fraction	66% (± 6%)	67% (± 4.6%)
Heart rate	60–100 bpm	60–100 bpm
Cardiac output	4.0–8.0 L/minute	4.0–8.0 L/minute

The right ventricular end-diastolic volume (RVEDV) ranges between 100 and 160 mL. The right ventricular end-diastolic volume index (RVEDVI) is calculated by RVEDV/BSA and ranges between 60 and 100 mL/m^{2}.

== See also ==
- End-systolic volume
- Stroke volume
