= Stroke volume =

Measurement in cardiovascular physiology

In cardiovascular physiology, stroke volume (SV) is the volume of blood pumped from the ventricle per beat. Stroke volume is calculated using measurements of ventricle volumes from an echocardiogram and subtracting the volume of the blood in the ventricle at the end of a beat (called end-systolic volume (Note: In short, the remaining blood volume left in the left ventricle not pumped out after a systole.)) from the volume of blood just prior to the beat (called end-diastolic volume). The term stroke volume can apply to each of the two ventricles of the heart, although when not explicitly stated it refers to the left ventricle and should therefore be referred to as left stroke volume (LSV). The stroke volumes for each ventricle are generally equal, both being approximately 90 mL in a healthy 70-kg man. Any persistent difference between the two stroke volumes, no matter how small, would inevitably lead to venous congestion of either the systemic or the pulmonary circulation, with a corresponding state of hypotension in the other circulatory system. A shunt (see patent foramen ovale and atrial septal defect) between the two systems will ensue if possible to reestablish the equilibrium.

Stroke volume is an important determinant of cardiac output, which is the product of stroke volume and heart rate, and is also used to calculate ejection fraction, which is stroke volume divided by end-diastolic volume. Because stroke volume decreases in certain conditions and disease states, stroke volume itself correlates with cardiac function.

== Calculation ==
Example values in healthy 70-kg man
Ventricular volumes
Measure	Right ventricle	Left ventricle
End-diastolic volume	144 mL (± 23 mL)	142 mL (± 21 mL)
End-diastolic volume / body surface area (mL/m^{2})	78 mL/m^{2} (± 11 mL/m^{2})	78 mL/m^{2} (± 8.8 mL/m^{2})
End-systolic volume	50 mL (± 14 mL)	47 mL (± 10 mL)
End-systolic volume / body surface area (mL/m^{2})	27 mL/m^{2} (± 7 mL/m^{2})	26 mL/m^{2} (± 5.1 mL/m^{2})
Stroke volume	94 mL (± 15 mL)	95 mL (± 14 mL)
Stroke volume / body surface area (mL/m^{2})	51 mL/m^{2} (± 7 mL/m^{2})	52 mL/m^{2} (± 6.2 mL/m^{2})
Ejection fraction	66% (± 6%)	67% (± 4.6%)
Heart rate	60–100 bpm	60–100 bpm
Cardiac output	4.0–8.0 L/minute	4.0–8.0 L/minute

Its value is obtained by subtracting end-systolic volume (ESV) from end-diastolic volume (EDV) for a given ventricle.

$$SV = EDV - ESV$$

In a healthy 70-kg man, ESV is approximately 50 mL and EDV is approximately 140 mL, giving a difference of 90 mL for the stroke volume.

Stroke work refers to the work, or pressure of the blood ("P") multiplied by the stroke volume.

== Determinants ==
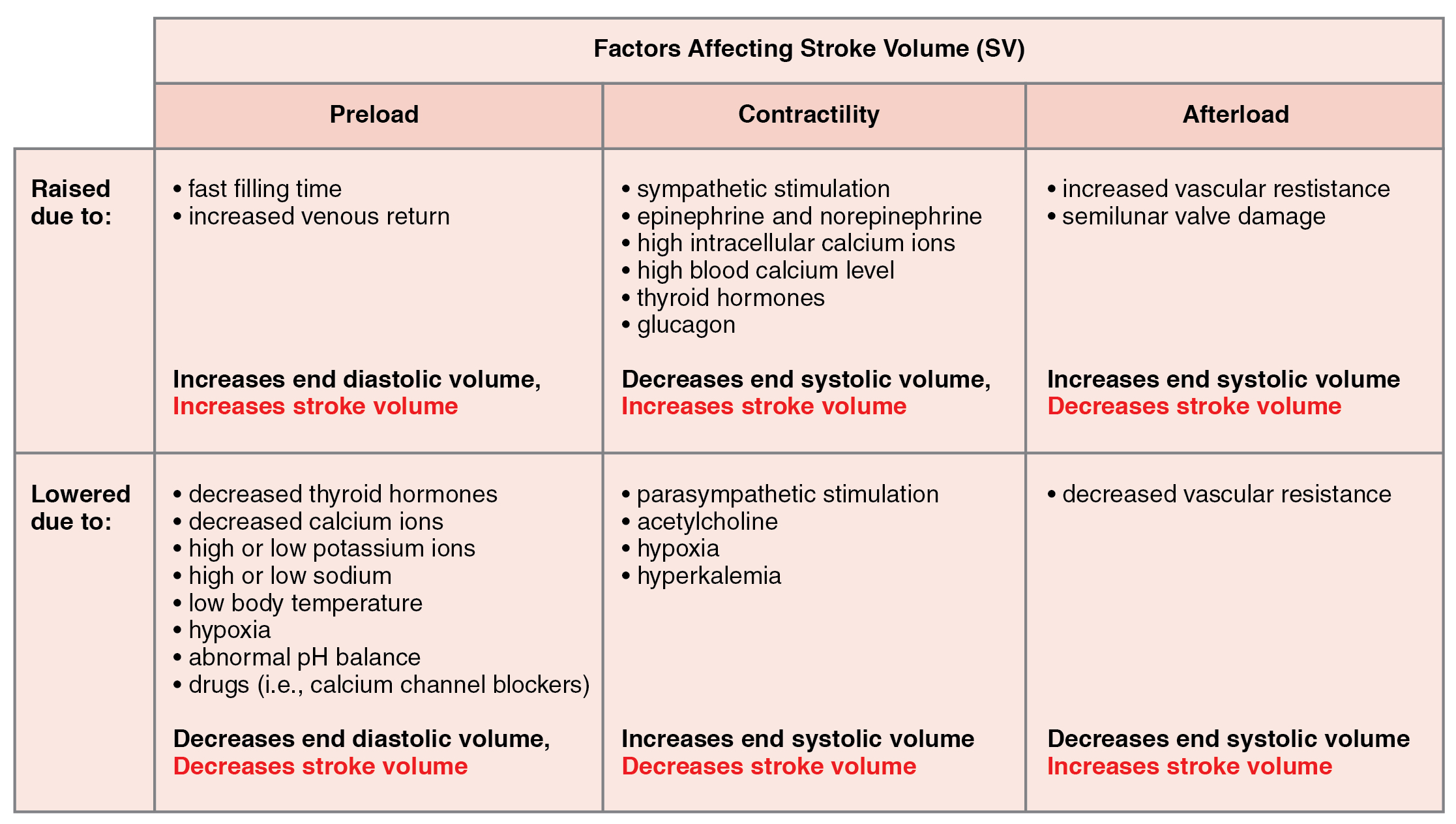
Major factors influencing stroke volume – Multiple factors impact preload, afterload, and contractility, and are the major considerations influencing SV.

Men, on average, have higher stroke volumes than women due to the larger size of their hearts. However, stroke volume depends on several factors such as heart size, its force of contraction, duration of contraction, preload (end-diastolic volume), and afterload. Corresponding to the oxygen uptake, women's need for blood flow does not decrease and a higher cardiac frequency makes up for their smaller stroke volume.

=== Exercise ===
Prolonged aerobic exercise training may also increase stroke volume, which frequently results in a lower (resting) heart rate. Reduced heart rate prolongs ventricular diastole (filling), increasing end-diastolic volume, and ultimately allowing more blood to be ejected.

=== Preload and afterload ===
Stroke volume is intrinsically controlled by preload (the degree to which the ventricles are stretched prior to contracting). An increase in the volume or speed of venous return will increase preload and, through the Frank–Starling law of the heart, will increase stroke volume. Decreased venous return has the opposite effect, causing a reduction in stroke volume.

Elevated afterload (commonly measured as the aortic pressure during systole) reduces stroke volume. It usually does not affect stroke volume in healthy individuals, but increased afterload will hinder the ventricles in ejecting blood, causing reduced stroke volume. Increased afterload may be found in aortic stenosis and arterial hypertension.

=== Stroke volume index ===
Similar to cardiac index, stroke volume index is a method of relating the stroke volume (SV) to the person's body surface area (BSA).

$SVI = {SV\over BSA} = {(CO / HR) \over BSA} = {CO \over {HR \times BSA}}$
