= Ventricle (heart) =

Chamber of the heart

- Computer generated animation of cut section of the human heart showing both ventricles.

Details

Identifiers
- Latin: ventriculus cordis
- MeSH: D006352
- TA98: A12.1.00.012
- FMA: 7100

A ventricle is one of two large chambers located toward the bottom of the heart that collect and expel blood towards the peripheral beds within the body and lungs. The blood pumped by a ventricle is supplied by an atrium, an adjacent chamber in the upper heart that is smaller than a ventricle. Interventricular means between the ventricles (for example the interventricular septum), while intraventricular means within one ventricle (for example an intraventricular block).

In a four-chambered heart, such as that in humans, there are two ventricles that operate in a double circulatory system: the right ventricle pumps blood into the pulmonary circulation to the lungs, and the left ventricle pumps blood into the systemic circulation through the aorta.

== Structure ==
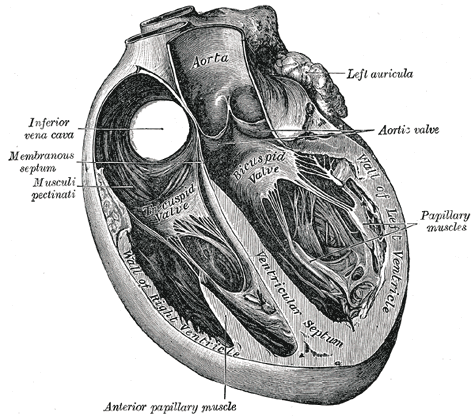
Heart section showing ventricles and ventricular septum

Ventricles have thicker walls than atria and generate higher blood pressures. The physiological load on the ventricles requiring pumping of blood throughout the body and lungs is much greater than the pressure generated by the atria to fill the ventricles. Further, the left ventricle has thicker walls than the right because it needs to pump blood to most of the body while the right ventricle fills only the lungs.

On the inner walls of the ventricles are irregular muscular columns called trabeculae carneae which cover all of the inner ventricular surfaces except that of the conus arteriosus, in the right ventricle. There are three types of these muscles. The third type, the papillary muscles, give origin at their apices to the chordae tendinae which attach to the cusps of the tricuspid valve and to the mitral valve.

The mass of the left ventricle, as estimated by magnetic resonance imaging, averages 143 g ± 38.4 g, with a range of 87–224 g.

The right ventricle is equal in size to the left ventricle and contains roughly 85 millilitres (3 imp fl oz; 3 US fl oz) in the adult. Its upper front surface is circled and convex, and forms much of the sternocostal surface of the heart. Its under surface is flattened, forming part of the diaphragmatic surface of the heart that rests upon the diaphragm.

Its posterior wall is formed by the ventricular septum, which bulges into the right ventricle, so that a transverse section of the cavity presents a semilunar outline. Its upper and left angle forms a conical pouch, the conus arteriosus, from which the pulmonary artery arises. A tendinous band, called the tendon of the conus arteriosus, extends upward from the right atrioventricular fibrous ring and connects the posterior surface of the conus arteriosus to the aorta.

=== Shape ===
The left ventricle is longer and more conical in shape than the right, and on transverse section its concavity presents an oval or nearly circular outline. It forms a small part of the sternocostal surface and a considerable part of the diaphragmatic surface of the heart; it also forms the apex of the heart. The left ventricle is thicker and more muscular than the right ventricle because it pumps blood at a higher pressure.

The right ventricle is triangular in shape and extends from the tricuspid valve in the right atrium to near the apex of the heart. Its wall is thickest at the apex and thins towards its base at the atrium. When viewed via cross section however, the right ventricle seems to be crescent shaped. The right ventricle is made of two components: the sinus and the conus. The Sinus is the inflow which flows away from the tricuspid valve. Three bands made from muscle, separate the right ventricle: the parietal, the septal, and the moderator band. The moderator band connects from the base of the anterior papillary muscle to the ventricular septum.

=== Development ===
By young adulthood, the walls of the left ventricle have thickened from three to six times greater than that of the right ventricle. This reflects the typical five times greater pressure workload this chamber performs while accepting blood returning from the pulmonary veins at ~80mmHg pressure (equivalent to around 11 kPa) and pushing it forward to the typical ~120mmHg pressure (around 16.3 kPa) in the aorta during each heartbeat. (The pressures stated are resting values and stated as relative to surrounding atmospheric which is the typical "0" reference pressure used in medicine.)

== Function ==
During systole, the ventricles contract, pumping blood through the body. During diastole, the ventricles relax and fill with blood again.

The left ventricle receives oxygenated blood from the left atrium via the mitral valve and pumps it through the aorta via the aortic valve, into the systemic circulation. The left ventricular muscle must relax and contract quickly and be able to increase or lower its pumping capacity under the control of the nervous system. In the diastolic phase, it has to relax very quickly after each contraction so as to quickly fill with the oxygenated blood flowing from the pulmonary veins. Likewise in the systolic phase, the left ventricle must contract rapidly and forcibly to pump this blood into the aorta, overcoming the much higher aortic pressure. The extra pressure exerted is also needed to stretch the aorta and other arteries to accommodate the increase in blood volume.

The right ventricle receives deoxygenated blood from the right atrium via the tricuspid valve and pumps it into the pulmonary artery via the pulmonary valve, into the pulmonary circulation.

=== Pumping volume ===
The typical healthy adult heart pumping volume is ~5 liters/min, resting. Maximum capacity pumping volume extends from ~25 liters/min for non-athletes to as high as ~45 liters/min for Olympic level athletes.

=== Volumes ===
In cardiology, the performance of the ventricles are measured with several volumetric parameters, including end-diastolic volume (EDV), end-systolic volume (ESV), stroke volume (SV) and ejection fraction (E_{f}).

Wiggers diagram of various events of a cardiac cycle, showing left ventricular volume as a red trace.

Ventricular volumes
Measure	Right ventricle	Left ventricle
End-diastolic volume	144 mL (± 23 mL)	142 mL (± 21 mL)
End-diastolic volume / body surface area (mL/m^{2})	78 mL/m^{2} (± 11 mL/m^{2})	78 mL/m^{2} (± 8.8 mL/m^{2})
End-systolic volume	50 mL (± 14 mL)	47 mL (± 10 mL)
End-systolic volume / body surface area (mL/m^{2})	27 mL/m^{2} (± 7 mL/m^{2})	26 mL/m^{2} (± 5.1 mL/m^{2})
Stroke volume	94 mL (± 15 mL)	95 mL (± 14 mL)
Stroke volume / body surface area (mL/m^{2})	51 mL/m^{2} (± 7 mL/m^{2})	52 mL/m^{2} (± 6.2 mL/m^{2})
Ejection fraction	66% (± 6%)	67% (± 4.6%)
Heart rate	60–100 bpm	60–100 bpm
Cardiac output	4.0–8.0 L/minute	4.0–8.0 L/minute

=== Pressures ===
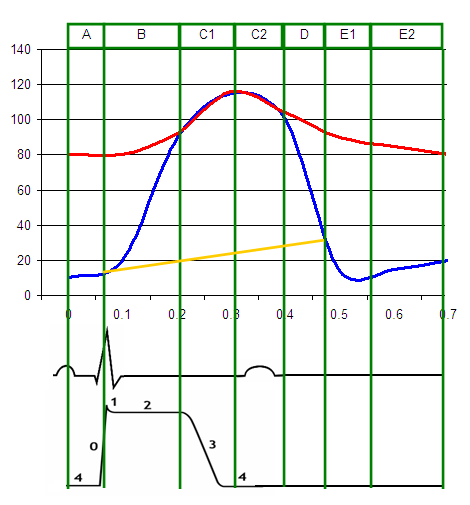
Partial Wiggers diagram. Red = aortic pressure Blue = left ventricular pressure Yellow = left atrial pressure.

Site		Normal pressure range (in mmHg)
Central venous pressure		3–8
Right ventricular pressure	systolic	15–30
Right ventricular pressure	diastolic	3–8
Pulmonary artery pressure	systolic	15–30
Pulmonary artery pressure	diastolic	4–12
Pulmonary vein/ Pulmonary capillary wedge pressure		2–15
Left ventricular pressure	systolic	100–140
Left ventricular pressure	diastolic	3–12

Ventricular pressure is a measure of blood pressure within the ventricles of the heart.

==== Left ====
During most of the cardiac cycle, ventricular pressure is less than the pressure in the aorta, but during systole, the ventricular pressure rapidly increases, and the two pressures become equal to each other (represented by the junction of the blue and red lines on the diagram on this page), the aortic valve opens, and blood is pumped to the body.

Elevated left ventricular end-diastolic pressure has been described as a risk factor in cardiac surgery.

Noninvasive approximations have been described.

An elevated pressure difference between the aortic pressure and the left ventricular pressure may be indicative of aortic stenosis.

==== Right ====
Right ventricular pressure demonstrates a different pressure-volume loop than left ventricular pressure.

=== Dimensions ===
The heart and its performance are also commonly measured in terms of dimensions, which in this case means one-dimensional distances, usually measured in millimeters. This is not as informative as volumes but may be much easier to estimate with (e.g., M-Mode echocardiography or with sonomicrometry, which is mostly used for animal model research). Optimally, it is specified with which plane the distance is measured in, e.g. the dimension of the longitudinal plane.

Dimension	Abbreviation	Definition	Normally
End-diastolic dimension	EDD	The diameter across a ventricle at the end of diastole, if not else specified then usually referring to the transverse (left-to-right) internal (luminal) distance, excluding thickness of walls, although it can also be measured as the external distance.	
Left ventricular end-diastolic dimension	LVEDD or sometimes LVDD	The end-diastolic dimension of the left ventricle.	48 mm, Range 36 – 56 mm
Right ventricular end-diastolic dimension	RVEDD or sometimes RVDD	The end-diastolic dimension of the right ventricle.	Range 10 – 26 mm
End-systolic dimension	ESD	ESD is similar to the end-diastolic dimension, but is measured at the end of systole (after the ventricles have pumped out blood) rather than at the end of diastole.	
Left ventricular end-systolic dimension	LVESD or sometimes LVSD	The end-systolic dimension of the left ventricle.	Range 20 – 40 mm
Right ventricular end-systolic dimension	RVESD or sometimes RVSD	The end-systolic dimension of the right ventricle.	Range 10 – 26 mm
Interventricular septal end diastolic dimension	IVSd	The thickness of the interventricular septum.	8.3 mm, Range 7 – 11 mm
Left ventricular end diastolic posterior wall dimension	LVPWd	The thickness of the posterior left ventricular wall.	8.3 mm, Range 7 – 11 mm
Mean left ventricular myocardial thickness	Mean LVMT	Average thickness of the left ventricle, with numbers given as 95% prediction interval for the short axis images at the mid-cavity level	Women: 4 - 8 mm Men: 5 - 9 mm
Mean right ventricular myocardial thickness	Mean RVMT	Average thickness of the right ventricle, with numbers given as 95% prediction interval.	4 - 7 mm
Left ventricular end systolic dimension		As above but measured during systole. This measurement is not commonly used clinically.	16 mm
Left atrial dimension	LA		Range 24 – 40 mm

Fractional shortening (FS) is the fraction of any diastolic dimension that is lost in systole. When referring to endocardial luminal distances, it is EDD minus ESD divided by EDD (times 100 when measured in percentage). Normal values may differ somewhat dependent on which anatomical plane is used to measure the distances. Normal range is 25–45%, Mild is 20–25%, Moderate is 15–20%, and Severe is <15%. Cardiology Diagnostic Tests Midwall fractional shortening may also be used to measure diastolic/systolic changes for inter-ventricular septal dimensions and posterior wall dimensions. However, both endocardial and midwall fractional shortening are dependent on myocardial wall thickness, and thereby dependent on long-axis function. By comparison, a measure of short-axis function termed epicardial volume change (EVC) is independent of myocardial wall thickness and represents isolated short-axis function.

== Clinical significance ==
An arrhythmia is an irregular heartbeat that can occur in the ventricles or atria. Normally the heartbeat is initiated in the SA node of the atrium but initiation can also occur in the Purkinje fibres of the ventricles, giving rise to premature ventricular contractions, also called ventricular extra beats. When these beats become grouped the condition is known as ventricular tachycardia.

Another form of arrhythmia is that of the ventricular escape beat. This can happen as a compensatory mechanism when there is a problem in the conduction system from the SA node.

The most severe form of arrhythmia is ventricular fibrillation which is the most common cause of cardiac arrest and subsequent sudden death.

- Ventricular septal defect
- Atrioventricular septal defect

== See also ==
- Wiggers diagram
