= Ventricular hypertrophy =

- The diagram shows a typical heart (left) and one with ventricular hypertrophy (right).
- Specialty: Cardiology

Ventricular hypertrophy (VH) is thickening of the walls of a ventricle (lower chamber) of the heart. Although left ventricular hypertrophy (LVH) is more common, right ventricular hypertrophy (RVH), as well as concurrent hypertrophy of both ventricles can also occur.

Ventricular hypertrophy can result from a variety of conditions, both adaptive and maladaptive. For example, it occurs in what is regarded as a physiologic, adaptive process in pregnancy in response to increased blood volume; but can also occur as a consequence of ventricular remodeling following a heart attack. Importantly, pathologic and physiologic remodeling engage different cellular pathways in the heart and result in different gross cardiac phenotypes.

== Presentation ==
In individuals with eccentric hypertrophy there may be little or no indication that hypertrophy has occurred as it is generally a healthy response to increased demands on the heart. Conversely, concentric hypertrophy can make itself known in a variety of ways. Most commonly, chest pain, either with or without exertion is present, along with shortness of breath with exertion, general fatigue, syncope, and palpitations. Overt signs of heart failure, such as edema, or shortness of breath without exertion are uncommon.

== Physiology ==
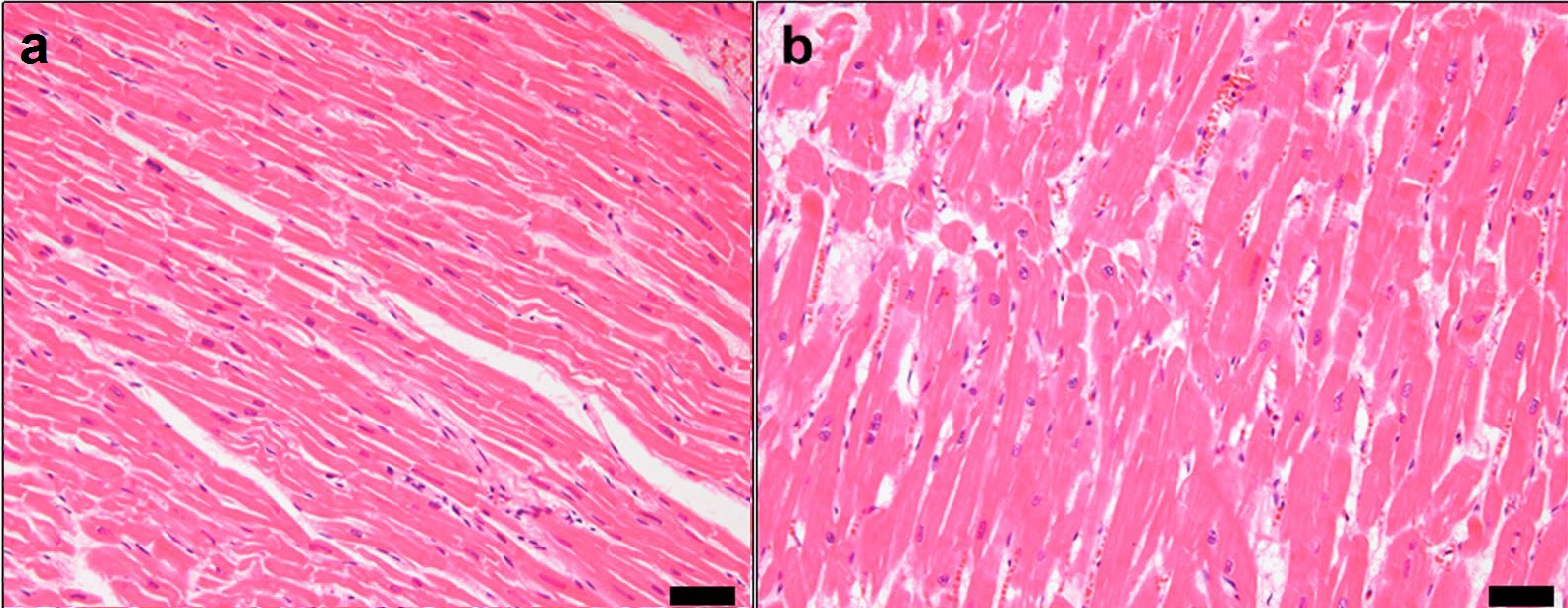
Histopathology of (a) normal myocardium and (b) myocardial hypertrophy. Scale bar indicates 50 μm.

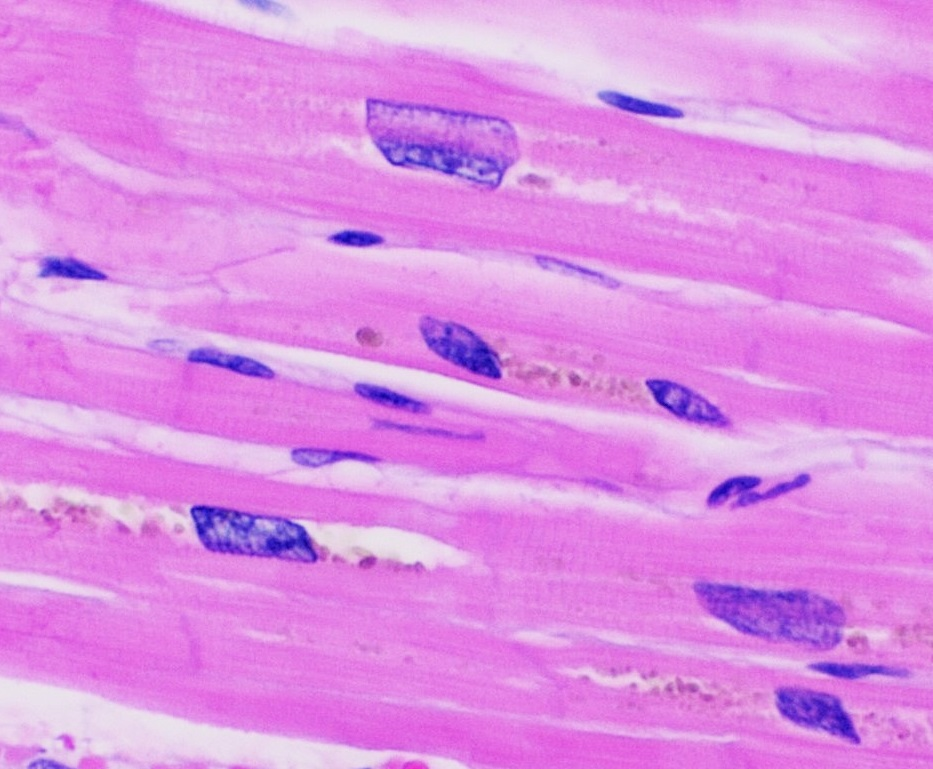
Rectangular "Boxcar" nuclei is a microscopic sign indicating myocardial hypertrophy.

The ventricles are the chambers in the heart responsible for pumping blood either to the lungs (right ventricle) or to the rest of the body (left ventricle). Ventricular hypertrophy may be divided into two categories: concentric hypertrophy and eccentric hypertrophy. These adaptations are related to how the cardiomyocyte contractile units, called sarcomeres, respond to stressors such as exercise or pathology. Concentric hypertrophy is a result of pressure overload on the heart, resulting in parallel sarcomerogenesis (addition of sarcomere units parallel to existing units). Eccentric hypertrophy is related to volume overload and leads to the addition of sarcomeres in series.

Concentric hypertrophy results from various stressors to the heart including hypertension, congenital heart defects (such as Tetralogy of Fallot), valvular defects (aortic coarction or stenosis), and primary defects of the myocardium which directly cause hypertrophy (hypertrophic cardiomyopathy). The underlying commonality in these disease states is an increase in pressures that the ventricles experience. For example, in tetralogy of Fallot, the right ventricle is exposed to the high pressures of the left heart due to a defect in the septum; as a result the right ventricle undergoes hypertrophy to compensate for these increased pressures. Similarly, in systemic hypertension, the left ventricle must work harder to overcome the higher pressures of the vascular system and responds by thickening to deal with increased wall stress.

Concentric hypertrophy is characterized by an addition of sarcomeres (the contractile units of cardiac cells) in parallel. The result is an increase in thickness of the myocardium without a corresponding increase in ventricular size. This is maladaptive largely because there is not a corresponding proliferation of the vasculature supplying the myocardium, resulting in ischemic areas of the heart. Ultimately, this response can be compensatory for a duration, and allow for improved cardiac function in the face of stressors. However, this type of hypertrophy can result in a dilated ventricle which is unable to effectively pump blood, leading to heart failure. When stressors that encourage this concentric hypertrophy are reduced or eliminated (either surgically corrected in the case of cardiac defects, or hypertension is reduced from diet and exercise) it is possible for the heart to undergo 'reverse remodeling', returning to a somewhat more 'normal' state instead of progressing to a dilated, pathologic phenotype. This reversion may even go beyond muscle mass, and repair abnormalities in cardiac connective tissue.

Eccentric hypertrophy is generally regarded as healthy, or physiologic hypertrophy and is often termed "athlete's heart." It is the normal response to healthy exercise or pregnancy, which results in an increase in the heart's muscle mass and pumping ability. It is a response to 'volume-overload', either as a result of increased blood return to the heart during exercise, or a response to an actual increase in absolute blood volume as in pregnancy. This increase in pumping ability is the result of the addition of sarcomeres in series, which enables the heart to contract with greater force. This is explained by the Frank Starling mechanism, which describes the sarcomere's ability to contract with greater force as more of the elements of its contractile units become engaged. This response can be dramatic; in trained athletes have hearts that have left ventricular mass up to 60% greater than untrained subjects. Rowers, cyclists, and cross-country skiers tend to have the largest hearts, with an average left ventricular wall thickness of 1.3 centimeters, compared to 1.1 centimeters in average adults. Though eccentric hypertrophy is termed 'athlete's heart' it is typically only found in individuals who are aerobically conditioned. For example, weight lifters tend to undergo remodeling which more closely resembles concentric hypertrophy, as the heart does not experience a volume-overload, but instead responds to transient pressure overload as a consequence of increased vascular resistance from pressures exerted on arteries by sustained muscular contraction.

Though it is the case that eccentric hypertrophy is largely considered to be a healthy response to increased cardiac demand, it is also associated with risks. For example, in athletes with significantly increased left ventricular weight there is also a corresponding increased risk for conduction abnormalities and sudden cardiac death. Additionally, in pregnant individuals, a subpopulation progress to peripartum cardiomyopathy, characterized by a dilation of the left ventricle and a corresponding deficit in heart function. There are suggestions that this progression is partially determined by underlying metabolic derangement (diabetes) and hypertension which may result in a more maladaptive cardiac response to pregnancy. As such, though it is convenient to consider clear cut distinctions between pathologic and physiologic cardiac hypertrophy, there may be a broader range of phenotypes than may be accounted for by gross cardiac phenotypes alone.

The development of pathologic states in LVH is complex. Electrical abnormalities are commonly found in individuals with LVH, both ventricular and super-ventricular tachycardia. Additionally, cytoarchitecture and the extracellular environment of the myocardium are altered, specifically genes typically expressed in the fetal heart are induced, as are collagen and other fibrotic proteins. LVH may interfere with heart functionality in a number of ways. Before progression to a dilated phenotype, mechanical obstruction of the outflow tract can occur, leading to reduced cardiac output. Additionally, increased fibrosis of the ventricle can result in a failure to relax appropriately which impairs cardiac filling and may lead to diastolic dysfunction or heart failure with preserved ejection fraction.

=== Research ===
Androgens, especially dihydrotestosterone (DHT), are active in the ventricle and promote hypertrophy. Researchers are investigating the potential for finasteride—a drug that inhibits the synthesis of DHT—to reduce hypertrophy.

== Mechanics of cardiac growth ==
As described in the previous section, it is believed that the eccentric hypertrophy is induced by volume-overload and that the concentric hypertrophy is induced by pressure-overload. Biomechanical approaches have been adopted to investigate the progression of cardiac hypertrophy for these two different types.

In the framework of continuum mechanics, the volumetric growth is often modeled using a multiplicative decomposition of the deformation gradient $\mathbf{F}$ into an elastic part $\mathbf{F}^e$ and a growth part $\mathbf{F}^g$, where $\mathbf{F} = \mathbf{F}^e\mathbf{F}^g$. For the generic orthotropic growth, the growth tensor can be represented as

$\mathbf{F}^g = \vartheta^f \mathbf{f}_0\otimes\mathbf{f}_0+\vartheta^s \mathbf{s}_0\otimes\mathbf{s}_0+\vartheta^n \mathbf{n}_0\otimes\mathbf{n}_0$,

where $\mathbf{f}_0, \mathbf{s}_0$ and $\mathbf{n}_0$ are normally the orthonormal vectors of the microstructure, and $\mathbf{\vartheta} = [\vartheta^f,\vartheta^s,\vartheta^n]$ is often referred as growth multipliers, which regulates the growth according to certain growth laws.

In eccentric growth, cardiomyocyte lengthens in the direction of the cell's long axis, $\mathbf{f}_0$. Therefore, the eccentric growth tensor can be expressed as

$\mathbf{F}^g = \mathbf{I} + [\vartheta^{\parallel}-1]\mathbf{f}_0\otimes\mathbf{f}_0$,

where $\mathbf{I}$ is the identity tensor.

The concentric growth, on the other hand, induces parallel deposition of the sarcomeres. The growth of cardiomyocyte is in the transverse direction, and thus the concentric growth tensor is expressed as:

$\mathbf{F}^g = \mathbf{I} + [\vartheta^{\perp}-1]\mathbf{s}_0\otimes\mathbf{s}_0$,

where $\mathbf{s}_0$ is the vector perpendicular to tangent plane of the cardiac wall.

There are different hypothesis on the growth laws governing the growth multipliers $\vartheta^{\parallel}$ and $\vartheta^{\perp}$. Motivated by the observation that eccentric growth is induced by volume-overload, strain-driven growth laws are applied to the $\vartheta^{\parallel}$. For the concentric growth, which is induced by pressure-overload, both stress-driven and strain-driven growth laws have been investigated and tested using computational finite element method. The biomechanical model based on continuum theories of growth can be used to predict the progression of the disease, and therefore can potentially help developing treatments to pathological hypertrophy.

== Diagnosis ==
=== Quantification ===
Hypertrophy of the ventricle can be measured with a number of techniques.

Electrocardiogram (EKG), a non-invasive assessment of the electrical system of the heart, can be useful in determining the degree of hypertrophy, as well as subsequent dysfunction it may precipitate. Specifically, an increase in Q wave size, abnormalities in the P wave, as well as giant inverted T waves, are indicative of significant concentric hypertrophy. Specific changes in repolarization and depolarization events are indicative of different underlying causes of hypertrophy and can assist in the appropriate management of the condition. Changes are common in both eccentric and concentric hypertrophy, though are substantially different from one another. In either condition fewer than 10% of patients with significant hypertrophy display a normal EKG.

Transthoracic echocardiography, a similarly non-invasive assessment of cardiac morphology, is also important in determining both the degree of hypertrophy, underlying pathologies (such as aortic coarction), and degree of cardiac dysfunction. Important considerations in echocardiography of the hypertrophied heart include lateral and septal wall thickness, degree of outflow tract obstruction, and systolic anterior wall motion (SAM) of the mitral valve, which can exacerbate outflow obstruction.

It is not uncommon to undergo cardiopulmonary exercise testing (CPET), which measures the heart's response to exercise, to assess the functional impairment caused by hypertrophy, and to prognosticate outcomes.

== In other animals ==
In most situations, described above, the increase in ventricular wall thickness is a slow process. However, in some instances hypertrophy may be "dramatic and rapid." In the Burmese python, consumption of a large meal is associated with an increase in metabolic work by a factor of seven and a 40% increase in ventricular mass within 48 hours, both of which return to normal within 28 days.

== See also ==
- Athletic heart syndrome
- Cardiac fibrosis
- Cardiology
- Cardiomegaly
- Cardiovascular disease
- ECG – See diagnosis
- Right ventricular hypertrophy
