= Hypertensive heart disease =

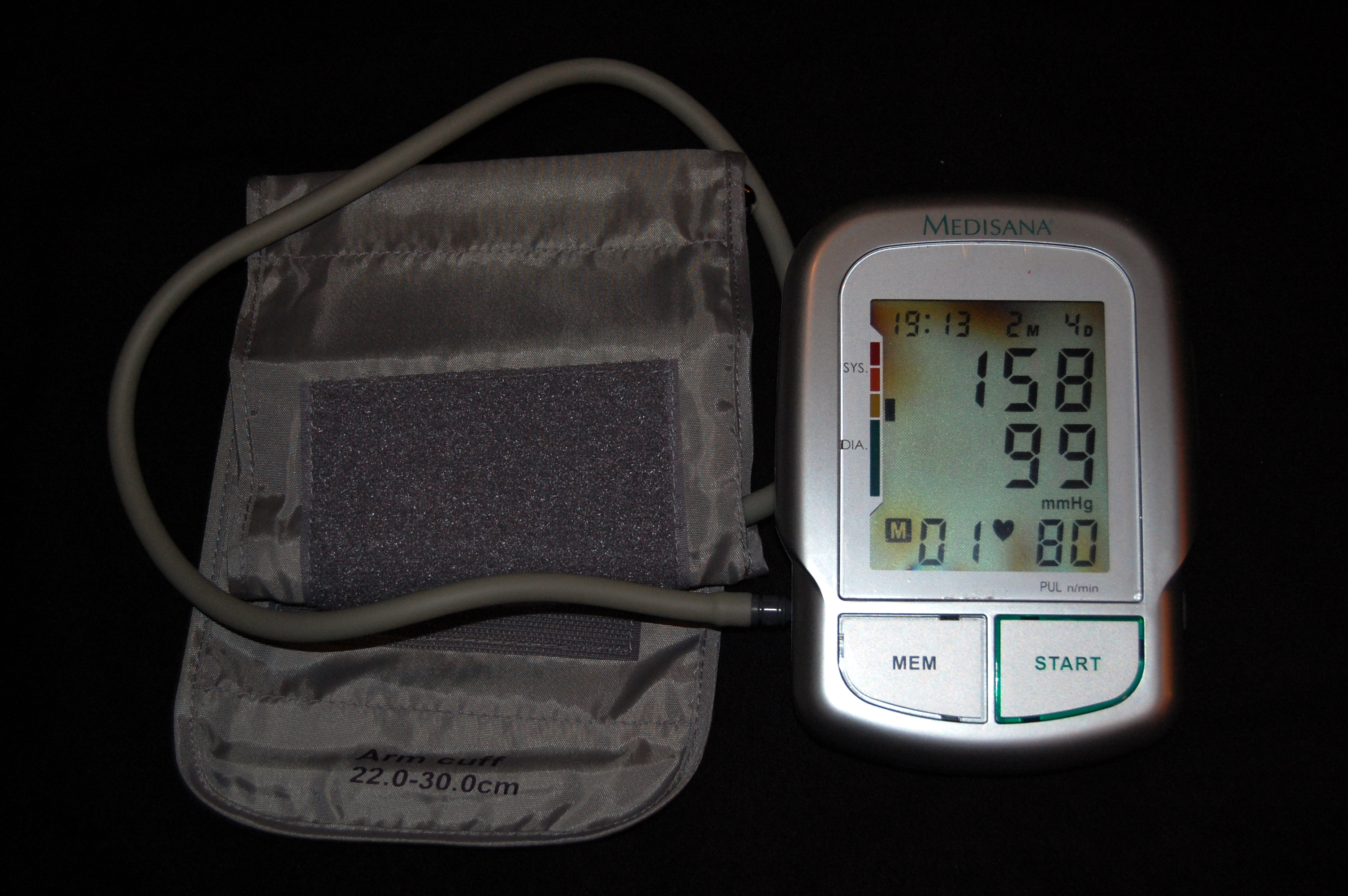
- Automated arm blood pressure meter showing arterial hypertension (shown a systolic blood pressure 158 mmHg, diastolic blood pressure 99 mmHg and heart rate of 80 beats per minute)
- Specialty: Cardiology

Hypertensive heart disease includes a number of complications of high blood pressure that affect the heart. While there are several definitions of hypertensive heart disease in the medical literature, the term is most widely used in the context of the International Classification of Diseases (ICD) coding categories. The definition includes heart failure and other cardiac complications of hypertension when a causal relationship between the heart disease and hypertension is stated or implied on the death certificate. In 2013 hypertensive heart disease resulted in 1.07 million deaths as compared with 630,000 deaths in 1990.

According to ICD-10, hypertensive heart disease (I11), and its subcategories: hypertensive heart disease with heart failure (I11.0) and hypertensive heart disease without heart failure (I11.9) are distinguished from chronic rheumatic heart diseases (I05-I09), other forms of heart disease (I30-I52) and ischemic heart diseases (I20-I25). However, since high blood pressure is a risk factor for atherosclerosis and ischemic heart disease, death rates from hypertensive heart disease provide an incomplete measure of the burden of disease due to high blood pressure.

== Signs and symptoms ==
The symptoms and signs of hypertensive heart disease will depend on whether or not it is accompanied by heart failure. In the absence of heart failure, hypertension, with or without enlargement of the heart (left ventricular hypertrophy) is usually symptomless.

Symptoms, signs and consequences of congestive heart failure can include:

- Fatigue
- Irregular pulse or palpitations
- Swelling of feet and ankles
- Weight gain
- Nausea
- Shortness of breath
- Difficulty sleeping flat in bed (orthopnea)
- Bloating and abdominal pain
- Greater need to urinate at night
- An enlarged heart (cardiomegaly)
- Left ventricular hypertrophy and left ventricular remodeling
- Diminished coronary flow reserve and silent myocardial ischemia
- Coronary heart disease and accelerated atherosclerosis
- Heart failure with normal left ventricular ejection fraction (HFNEF), often termed diastolic heart failure
- Atrial fibrillation, other cardiac arrhythmias, or sudden cardiac death

Heart failure can develop insidiously over time or patients can present acutely with acute heart failure or acute decompensated heart failure and pulmonary edema due to sudden failure of pump function of the heart. Sudden failure can be precipitated by a variety of causes, including myocardial ischemia, marked increases in blood pressure, or cardiac arrhythmias.

== Diagnosis ==
Stages of elevated BP and hypertension
Category	Systolic BP (mm Hg)	Diastolic BP (mm Hg)
Normal	< 120	< 80
Elevated	120–129 and	<80
Stage I	130–139 or	80–89
Stage II	at least 140 or	at least 90

=== Differential diagnosis ===
Other conditions can share features with hypertensive heart disease and need to be considered in the differential diagnosis. For example:

- Coronary artery disease or ischemic heart diseases due to atherosclerosis
- Hypertrophic cardiomyopathy
- Left ventricular hypertrophy in athletes
- Congestive heart failure or heart failure with normal ejection fraction due to other causes
- Atrial fibrillation or other disorders of cardiac rhythm due to other causes
- Sleep apnea

== Prevention ==
Because there are no symptoms with high blood pressure, people can have the condition without knowing it. Diagnosing high blood pressure early can help prevent heart disease, stroke, eye problems, and chronic kidney disease.

The risk of cardiovascular disease and death can be reduced by lifestyle modifications, including dietary advice, promotion of weight loss and regular aerobic exercise, moderation of alcohol intake and cessation of smoking. Drug treatment may also be needed to control the hypertension and reduce the risk of cardiovascular disease, manage the heart failure, or control cardiac arrhythmias. Patients with hypertensive heart disease should avoid taking over the counter nonsteroidal anti-inflammatory drugs (NSAIDs), or cough suppressants, and decongestants containing sympathomimetics, unless otherwise advised by their physician as these can exacerbate hypertension and heart failure.

=== Blood pressure goals ===
According to JNC 7, BP goals should be as follows:

- Less than 140/90mm Hg in patients with uncomplicated hypertension
- Less than 130/85mm Hg in patients with diabetes and those with renal disease with less than 1g/24-hour proteinuria
- Less than 125/75mm Hg in patients with renal disease and more than 1 g/24-hour proteinuria

== Treatment ==
The medical care of patients with hypertensive heart disease falls under 2 categories—

- Treatment of hypertension
- Prevention (and, if present, treatment) of heart failure or other cardiovascular disease

== Epidemiology ==
Death rate from hypertensive heart disease who ghe age standardized

Hypertension or high blood pressure affects at least 26.4% of the world's population. Hypertensive heart disease is only one of several diseases attributable to high blood pressure. Other diseases caused by high blood pressure include ischemic heart disease, cancer, stroke, peripheral arterial disease, aneurysms and kidney disease. Hypertension increases the risk of heart failure by two or three-fold and probably accounts for about 25% of all cases of heart failure. In addition, hypertension precedes heart failure in 90% of cases, and the majority of heart failure in the elderly may be attributable to hypertension. Hypertensive heart disease was estimated to be responsible for 1.0 million deaths worldwide in 2004 (or approximately 1.7% of all deaths globally), and was ranked 13th in the leading global causes of death for all ages. A world map shows the estimated disability-adjusted life years per 100,000 inhabitants lost due to hypertensive heart disease in 2004.

=== Sex differences ===
There are more women than men with hypertension, and, although men develop hypertension earlier in life, hypertension in women is less well controlled. The consequences of high blood pressure in women are a major public health problem and hypertension is a more important contributory factor in heart attacks in women than men. Until recently women have been under-represented in clinical trials in hypertension and heart failure. Nevertheless, there is some evidence that the effectiveness of antihypertensive drugs differs between men and women and that treatment for heart failure may be less effective in women.

=== Ethnic differences ===
Studies in the US indicate that a disproportionate number of African Americans have hypertension compared with non-Hispanic whites and Mexican Americans, and that they have a greater burden of hypertensive heart disease. Heart failure is more common in people of African American ethnicity, mortality from heart failure is also consistently higher than in white patients, and it develops at an earlier age. Recent data suggests that rates of hypertension are increasing more rapidly in African Americans than other ethnic groups. The excess of high blood pressure and its consequences in African Americans is likely to contribute to their shorter life expectancy compared with white Americans.
