= Dor procedure =

Medical technique

- Specialty: Cardiology

The Dor procedure is a medical technique used as part of heart surgery and originally introduced by the French cardiac surgeon Vincent Dor (b.1932). It is also known as endoventricular circular patch plasty (EVCPP).

In 1985, Dor introduced EVCPP as a viable method for restoring a dilated left ventricle (LV) to its normal, elliptical geometry. The Dor procedure uses a circular suture and a Dacron patch to correct LV aneurysms and exclude scarred parts of the septum and ventricular wall and would prove to be the best option amongst the other methods of ventricular remodeling, i.e. Cooley's linear suturing and Jatene's circular external suturing. EVCPP is a relatively easy procedure that covers all aspects of successful heart restoration—restores ventricular shape, increases ejection fraction, decreases the left ventricular end systolic volume index (LVESVI), and allows for complete coronary revascularization.

== Cardiac geometry ==
The myocardium consists of a single, vascular, continuous tissue that wraps around itself, spiraling up from the apex of the heart, to form a helix with elliptically shaped ventricles. This spiral produces an oblique muscle fiber orientation, meaning that the fibers form a more ventricle ‘x’ shape, so that when fibers shorten 15%, it produces a 60% ejection fraction. Because of its elliptical shape and defined apex, the ventricle is subjected to a relatively low level of lateral stress.

== Indications ==
A dilated left ventricle is generally due to the effects of a myocardial infarction. An occlusion, or blockage, results in either akinetic (non-beating) or dyskinetic (irregular beating) tissue downstream from the occlusion. This tissue is virtually useless. However, the volume of blood that fills the ventricle prior to contraction, or end-diastolic volume, remains constant, so the tissue that still functions has to do more work to eject the blood, as the Frank-Starling Laws demand.

The tension on the functioning tissue increases as it compensates for the work of the necrotic tissue, so, as per Laplace's law, the radius of the ventricle increases and the thickness of the ventricular wall decreases. The apex of the heart becomes circular, hypertrophy ensues in the viable myocardial tissue, and the valve opening widens. As the ventricle dilates, the muscle fiber orientation, which is critical to a good ejection fraction, becomes transverse, or more horizontal. Subsequently, the ejection fraction decreases; a 15% shortening produces only a 30% ejection fraction. The lateral stress on the ventricle increases. Overall, the dilated left ventricle cannot produce a strong enough contraction. Nonviable myocardial muscle mass (NVMMM) implies a distinct, inexpensively reproduced signature (electrocardiography and echocardiography) of several contemporary myocardial performance determinants when compared to viable myocardial muscle mass (VMMM). Ratio between the two in heart failure on a time curve is a determinate of compensatory geometric remodeling of the myocardium. Fick/Frank/Starling describes gas diffusion, fluid and compliance relationships of the myocardium, primarily in systole. Geometric derangement induced by nonviable myocardium (see myocardial infarction) is exponentially impacted and proportional to the weight of the performance determinant measured. Viable/Nonviable myocardial mass fraction is substantially reduced by surgical interventions such as Dor and Batista.

== Patient evaluation ==
Doctors take a cardiac MRI to determine extent and location of the damage. Occasionally this reveals that the patient may be better suited for biventricular pacing or a defibrillator, but if the cardiologist determines that the Dor procedure is necessary, then the patient must display other symptoms to indicate that they would be a good candidate, including: angina, heart failure, arrhythmias or a combination of the three, large areas of akinesis or dyskensis, ejection fraction of less than forty percent

Contraindications include: dysfunctional right ventricle, pulmonary hypertension, dysfunction at the base of the heart, systolic pulmonary artery pressure greater than 60mmHg (in the absence of severe mitral regurgitation)

== Procedure ==
Surgeons usually perform the Dor procedure following a coronary artery bypass graft (CABG). EVCPP consumes only approximately twenty minutes of the three- to four-hour procedure.

To begin a basic remodeling, the surgeon makes an incision at the center of the depressed area on the LV wall and removes blood clots and endocardial scar tissue. To restore the heart to its elliptical shape, an endoventricular suture is put in place and a longitudinal tuck is made to return the cardiac apex from the posterior to the front. The suture also serves as guidance for the patch location. The surgeon then inserts a balloon into the ventricular cavity to ensure correct size and sutures a Dacron patch, deflating the balloon and removing it before complete closure. The non-viable fibrous tissue is pulled over the patch, and surgical glue is occasionally used to complete the closure. When the lesion is placed on the anteroseptoapical wall of the heart, it will include the septum and apex more extensively than the lateral wall. As a result, the suture is placed deeply within the septum, and the new neck of the suture, which holds the Dacron patch, extends from the septum. Dor explicates this procedure in detail. When the lesion is placed on the posterolateral wall of the heart, a triangular patch is used and stabilized by the posterior mitral annulus. This placement of the lesion allows for mitral valve replacement to be easily conducted by the transventricular approach. (The surgeon does not have to incise the atrium, rather can replace the valve through the already incised ventricle.)

It is recommended that the patient be placed on a mild anti-coagulant post operation to reduce the risk of blood clots. Some surgeons suggest the use of stronger anti-coagulants.

== Disadvantages ==
The disadvantage to the Dor procedure is that it places synthetic tissue inside the LV cavity. However, it is possible to replace the Dacron patch with autologous tissue. The surgeon can make a semicircular patch, mobilized with a septal hinge, out of the endocardial scar or use autologous patches of the pericardium.

== Results ==
The Dor procedure requires a hospital stay of approximately 8 days, which is only one day longer than CABG, and the early mortality rate is about 5.6%. Post-operation, the patient does not have any lifestyle constraints other than those associated with CABG. There is a 4% chance the patient will require another cardiac operation: 18% of patients who underwent CABG had recurrent heart failure. Because the Dor procedure restores the left ventricle to its correct, elliptical orientation, it results in a mean ejection fraction increase of 12.5%. This number continues to improve over the patient's lifetime, and patients can expect to live an extra 4–10 years, which is 3.3% longer than CABG alone with virtually no extra risk.
