= Mitiperstat =

Chemical compound

Legal status
- Legal status: Investigational

Identifiers
- IUPAC name: 1-[[2-[(1R)-1-Aminoethyl]-4-chlorophenyl]methyl]-2-sulfanylidene-5H-pyrrolo[3,2-d]pyrimidin-4-one
- CAS Number: 1933460-19-5
- PubChem CID: 121362450
- ChemSpider: 114711423
- UNII: S6GYK3X4QQ
- ChEMBL: ChEMBL5095218

Chemical and physical data
- Formula: C_{15}H_{15}ClN_{4}OS
- Molar mass: 334.82 g·mol^{−1}
- 3D model (JSmol): Interactive image
- SMILES: C[C@H](C1=C(C=CC(=C1)Cl)CN2C3=C(C(=O)NC2=S)NC=C3)N
- InChI: InChI=1S/C15H15ClN4OS/c1-8(17)11-6-10(16)3-2-9(11)7-20-12-4-5-18-13(12)14(21)19-15(20)22/h2-6,8,18H,7,17H2,1H3,(H,19,21,22)/t8-/m1/s1; Key:BHKKSKOHRFHHIN-MRVPVSSYSA-N

Mitiperstat (AZD4831) is an irreversible inhibitor of myeloperoxidase and experimental drug in development for heart failure with preserved ejection fraction. It is being developed by AstraZeneca.
