= LVM =

LVM can stand for:

- Las Vegas Monorail, a rail transport system in Las Vegas
- Latent variable model, a statistical model
- Left ventricular mass, a cardiac measurement
- Legio V Macedonica, a Roman legion
- Levenshulme railway station, Manchester, England (National Rail station code)
- Logical volume management, a method of transparently storing computer data spread over several partitions
  - Logical Volume Manager, an implementation of logical volume management in the Linux kernel
- Ludwig von Mises Institute, a libertarian academic organisation
- Ministry of Transport and Communications' acronym in Finnish, Liikenne- ja viestintäministeriö.
- Levomethorphan, an opioid analgesic
