= Lvmi =

LVMI can stand for:

- Left ventricular mass index
- Left ventricular myocardial infarction
- Ludwig von Mises Institute for Austrian Economics
