= Sanjiv J. Shah =

American cardiologist and researcher

- Education: Northwestern University Feinberg School of Medicine (MD)
- Known for: Research on heart failure with preserved ejection fraction; "phenomapping"
- Awards: Member, American Society for Clinical Investigation (2024)
- Scientific career
- Fields: Cardiology, heart failure
- Workplaces: Northwestern University Feinberg School of Medicine

Sanjiv J. Shah is an American cardiologist and clinical researcher. He is the Neil J. Stone, MD, Professor of Medicine in the Division of Cardiology at the Feinberg School of Medicine of Northwestern University in Chicago, where he directs the Center for Deep Phenotyping and Precision Therapeutics.

Shah's research concerns heart failure with preserved ejection fraction (HFpEF) and how patients with the condition can be divided into more uniform subgroups. In 2007 he founded a clinical program at Northwestern devoted to HFpEF, which the university describes as the first of its kind. His 2015 "phenomapping" study used computer algorithms to sort patients into subgroups; later reviews have described it as the first attempt of this kind in HFpEF and the starting point of a series of similar studies. He has also worked on clinical trials of treatments for HFpEF and leads the data center of HeartShare, a federally funded study of its subtypes.

Shah was elected to the American Society for Clinical Investigation in 2024 and was included in Clarivate's list of Highly Cited Researchers each year from 2021 to 2025.

== Education and career ==
Shah received his MD from Northwestern's Feinberg School of Medicine in 2000. He completed a residency at the University of California, San Francisco in 2003, followed by fellowship training there, which ended in 2006, and at the University of Chicago, which ended in 2007.

He has spent his faculty career at Northwestern. In 2007 he started a clinical program there dedicated to HFpEF, which Northwestern describes as the first such program in the world. He was an associate professor of medicine in cardiology by 2015. In 2019 Northwestern Medicine reported that he had been named the Neil J. Stone, MD, Professor. By 2021 he was director both of Northwestern's Center for Deep Phenotyping and Precision Therapeutics and of the clinical trials unit of the university's Bluhm Cardiovascular Institute. He was listed as an associate editor on the February 2021 masthead of JAMA Cardiology.

== Research ==
=== Subtypes of HFpEF ===
HFpEF is diagnosed in patients with a wide range of underlying conditions, and Shah has argued that a single approach to treatment may not suit all of them. The research arm of his HFpEF clinic, funded by the American Heart Association, was set up to study this variation.

In a study published in Circulation in 2015, Shah and colleagues, including the cardiologist Rahul Deo, applied machine learning methods to several dozen clinical, laboratory and heart-imaging measurements from about 400 patients seen at the clinic, and divided them into three groups, an approach they called "phenomapping". A 2024 review by other researchers described Shah's group as the first to attempt this kind of subdivision of HFpEF. A 2020 review of artificial intelligence in cardiology described it as an application of precision medicine that proposed a new classification of the condition, and a 2023 systematic review of 34 clustering studies in heart failure dated the series to Shah's paper. That review found that similar groups recurred across many of the later studies, and suggested that one of them, a group of younger patients with few other illnesses, might correspond to a deficiency of natriuretic peptides that Shah and colleagues had proposed.

PROMIS-HFpEF, a multinational study of the heart's small blood vessels that Shah reported with colleagues in 2018, was cited in a later review as evidence that dysfunction of these vessels is common in HFpEF.

=== HeartShare ===
In 2020 Shah was lead author of the report of a National Heart, Lung, and Blood Institute (NHLBI) working group on research priorities in HFpEF, which called for shared collections of detailed patient data and tissue samples and for computational methods to analyze them. The NHLBI then set up HeartShare, which combines existing datasets with a new group of about 1,000 patients with HFpEF studied at six clinical centers. In 2021 Northwestern received a grant of $16.7 million, with Shah as lead investigator, to run the program's data translation center, which coordinates and combines data from all sites.

=== Clinical trials ===
Shah was one of the investigators of TOPCAT, a trial of the drug spironolactone in HFpEF, and described its participants in a 2013 report. The trial did not find a statistically significant reduction in its primary composite outcome of cardiovascular death, aborted cardiac arrest or hospitalization for heart failure, and a 2016 analysis reported lower event rates among patients enrolled in Russia and Georgia than in the Americas.

In 2022 he presented the results of REDUCE LAP-HF II, a trial of an implanted device that creates a small opening between the upper chambers of the heart to relieve pressure on the left side; they were published in The Lancet. A 2024 review summarized the trial as neutral overall, and noted that patients with the highest lung-artery pressures or the largest right atria had more heart failure events with the device than with a sham procedure.

Shah was also part of the research group for STEP-HFpEF, a trial of the weight-loss drug semaglutide in people with HFpEF and obesity, and was first author of a pooled analysis of how the drug affected patients taking diuretics. A 2025 expert consensus document in the European Journal of Heart Failure cited that analysis when advising close monitoring of blood pressure, kidney function and fluid status in the first weeks of treatment with such drugs. The document described STEP-HFpEF and a later trial of tirzepatide as giving "important signals of benefit" in obesity-related HFpEF, while noting high dropout rates and the need for larger trials measuring clinical events.

== Awards and honors ==
Shah was elected to the American Society for Clinical Investigation in 2024. Clarivate included him in its Highly Cited Researchers list each year from 2021 to 2025, listing him under clinical medicine in 2021 and 2025. According to the Heart Failure Society of America, he has received the American College of Cardiology's W. Proctor Harvey teaching award.

== Selected works ==
- Shah, Sanjiv J.; Heitner, John F.; Sweitzer, Nancy K.; et al. (March 2013). "Baseline Characteristics of Patients in the Treatment of Preserved Cardiac Function Heart Failure With an Aldosterone Antagonist Trial". Circulation: Heart Failure. 6 (2): 184–192. doi:10.1161/CIRCHEARTFAILURE.112.972794. PMC 3605409. PMID 23258572.
- Shah, Sanjiv J.; Katz, Daniel H.; Selvaraj, Senthil; et al. (January 20, 2015). "Phenomapping for Novel Classification of Heart Failure With Preserved Ejection Fraction". Circulation. 131 (3): 269–279. doi:10.1161/CIRCULATIONAHA.114.010637. PMC 4302027. PMID 25398313.
- Shah, Sanjiv J.; Kitzman, Dalane W.; Borlaug, Barry A.; et al. (July 5, 2016). "Phenotype-Specific Treatment of Heart Failure With Preserved Ejection Fraction: A Multiorgan Roadmap". Circulation. 134 (1): 73–90. doi:10.1161/CIRCULATIONAHA.116.021884. PMC 4930115. PMID 27358439.
- Shah, Sanjiv J.; Lam, Carolyn S. P.; Svedlund, Sara; et al. (October 1, 2018). "Prevalence and correlates of coronary microvascular dysfunction in heart failure with preserved ejection fraction: PROMIS-HFpEF". European Heart Journal. 39 (37): 3439–3450. doi:10.1093/eurheartj/ehy531. PMC 6927847. PMID 30165580.
- Shah, Sanjiv J.; Borlaug, Barry A.; Kitzman, Dalane W.; et al. (March 24, 2020). "Research Priorities for Heart Failure With Preserved Ejection Fraction: National Heart, Lung, and Blood Institute Working Group Summary". Circulation. 141 (12): 1001–1026. doi:10.1161/CIRCULATIONAHA.119.041886. PMC 7101072. PMID 32202936.
- Shah, Sanjiv J.; Borlaug, Barry A.; Chung, Eugene S.; et al. (March 2022). "Atrial shunt device for heart failure with preserved and mildly reduced ejection fraction (REDUCE LAP-HF II): a randomised, multicentre, blinded, sham-controlled trial". The Lancet. 399 (10330): 1130–1140. doi:10.1016/S0140-6736(22)00016-2. hdl:11370/45900625-7796-416c-9dcb-916faecdcff6. PMID 35120593.
