= Myocardial scarring =

Fibrous tissue in the heart

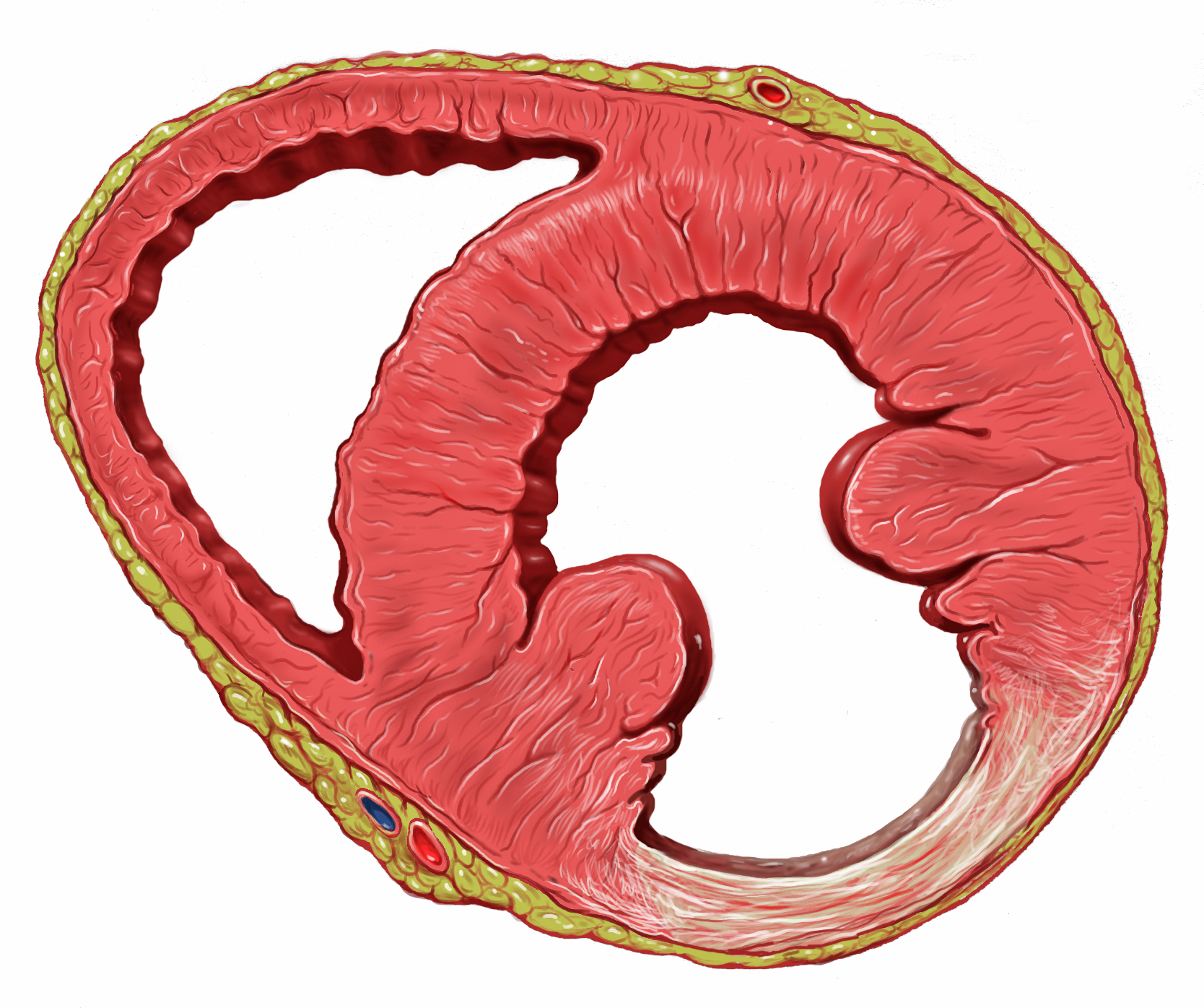
Inferior left ventricle wall scar, short axis echocardiography view

Myocardial scarring is the accumulation of fibrous tissue resulting after some form of trauma to the cardiac tissue. Fibrosis is the formation of excess tissue in replacement of necrotic or extensively damaged tissue. Fibrosis in the heart is often hard to detect because fibromas, scar tissue or small tumors formed in one cell line, are often formed. Because they are so small, they can be hard to detect by methods such as magnetic resonance imaging. A cell line is a path of fibrosis that follow only a line of cells.

== Causes ==
=== Myocardial infarction ===
A myocardial infarction, also known as a heart attack, often result in the formation of fibrosis. A myocardial infarction is an ischemic event, or a restriction of blood flow to body tissue, such as by atherothrombosis. Without blood flow to the myocardium, it is deprived of oxygen, causing tissue death and irreversible damage. The tissue destroyed by the infarction is replaced with non-functioning fibrosis, restoring some of the structural integrity of the organ but resulting in impaired myocardial function.

=== Coronary heart disease ===
Coronary heart disease, also known as coronary artery disease, is one of the most common causes of myocardial damage, affecting over three million people in the United States. In coronary heart disease, the coronary arteries narrow due to the buildup of atheroma or fatty deposits on the vessel walls. The atheroma causes the blood flow of the arteries to be restricted. By restricting the blood flow, the tissue is still receiving some oxygen, but not enough to sustain the tissue over time. The accumulation of the fibrotic tissue is much slower in coronary heart disease compared to an infarction because the tissue is still receiving some oxygen.

=== Birth defect repairs ===
Another form of myocardial scarring results from surgical repairs. Surgical repairs are often necessary for a person born with a congenital defect of the heart. While surgical laparoscopy still leaves myocardial scarring, the trauma seems to be less damaging then naturally occurring scarring.

=== Excessive exercise ===
Excessive exercise, particularly in endurance athletes, has been linked to myocardial scarring, a condition where fibrous tissue in the heart muscle forms. Intense, prolonged physical activity can lead to repetitive stress on the myocardium, causing micro-injuries that may trigger inflammation and subsequent scarring. This is especially prevalent in individuals engaging in extreme endurance sports, such as marathons or ultra-marathons, very long bicycle racing, where sustained high cardiac output can strain the heart. Studies have shown that some athletes develop focal myocardial fibrosis, detectable via cardiac imaging (cardiac MRI, etc), which may increase the risk of arrhythmias or reduced cardiac function over time. While exercise is generally beneficial for heart health, excessive and prolonged exertion without adequate recovery may contribute to pathological changes in susceptible individuals - genetic tendency toward cardiac fibrosis, undiagnosed heart issues, or a reduced ability to recover from exercise-induced inflammation or micro-injuries.

=== Hypertension ===
Chronic hypertension can lead to myocardial scarring by imposing persistent high pressure on heart walls. This stress causes left ventricular hypertrophy, increasing oxygen demand and potentially leading to micro-ischemia. Over time, these changes may result in fibrosis as the heart attempts to repair damaged tissue, impairing cardiac function.

=== Cardiomyopathies ===
Cardiomyopathies, such as dilated or hypertrophic cardiomyopathy, are associated with myocardial scarring. These conditions alter heart muscle structure and function. Scarring may contribute to heart failure or arrhythmias.

=== Myocarditis ===
Myocarditis, inflammation of the heart muscle often caused by viral infections, can result in myocardial scarring. The inflammatory response damages cardiac tissue, triggering repair processes that replace necrotic cells with fibrous tissue. This scarring may increase the risk of arrhythmias.

=== Cardiac toxins ===
Exposure to cardiotoxic substances, such as chemotherapy drugs (e.g., anthracyclines), alcohol, or recreational drugs like cocaine, can cause myocardial scarring due to free radical damage, strand breakage of DNA in cardiomyocytes. These toxins induce direct damage to heart muscle cells, leading to inflammation and fibrosis as the body attempts to repair the injured tissue.

=== Aging ===
Aging is a natural contributor to myocardial scarring. Over time, cumulative stress from oxidative damage, low-grade inflammation, and microvascular changes can lead to gradual fibrosis in the heart. This age-related scarring may reduce cardiac elasticity and contribute to diastolic dysfunction in older individuals.

== Formation ==
Immediately after damage to the myocardium occurs, the damaged tissue becomes inflamed. Inflammation is the accumulations of neutrophils, macrophages, and lymphocytes at the site of the trauma. In addition, "inflammatory cells upregulate the release of a myriad of signaling cytokines, growth factors, and hormones including transforming growth factor β, interleukins 1, 2, 6, and 10, tumor necrosis factor α, interferon γ, chemokines of the CC and CXC families, angiotensin II, norepinephrine, endothelin, natriuretic peptides, and platelet-derived growth factors". Both the necrotic cells and the inflamed myocardium secrete and activate matrix metalloproteinase. Metalloproteinase aids in the destruction and reabsorption of necrotic tissue. After several days, collagen accumulation at the site of injury begins to occur. As part of the extracellular matrix, granulated tissue consisting of fibrin, fibronectin, laminin, and glycosaminoglycan is suspended in a collagen base. The extracellular matrix acts as scaffolding for the fibrillar collagen to form. The fibrillar collagen is the main constitute of what will become the scar tissue.
