= Ventricular remodeling =

Changes in the physiology of the heart

In cardiology, ventricular remodeling (or cardiac remodeling) refers to changes in the size, shape, structure, and function of the heart. This can happen as a result of exercise (physiological remodeling) or after injury to the heart muscle (pathological remodeling). The injury is typically due to acute myocardial infarction (usually transmural or ST segment elevation infarction), but may be from a number of causes that result in increased pressure or volume, causing pressure overload or volume overload (forms of strain) on the heart. Chronic hypertension, congenital heart disease with intracardiac shunting, and valvular heart disease may also lead to remodeling. After the insult occurs, a series of histopathological and structural changes occur in the left ventricular myocardium that lead to progressive decline in left ventricular performance. Ultimately, ventricular remodeling may result in diminished contractile (systolic) function and reduced stroke volume.

Physiological remodeling is reversible while pathological remodeling is mostly irreversible. Remodeling of the ventricles under left/right pressure demand make mismatches inevitable. Pathologic pressure mismatches between the pulmonary and systemic circulation guide compensatory remodeling of the left and right ventricles. The term "reverse remodeling" in cardiology implies an improvement in ventricular mechanics and function following a remote injury or pathological process.

Ventricular remodeling may include ventricular hypertrophy, ventricular dilation, cardiomegaly, and other changes. It is an aspect of cardiomyopathy, of which there are many types. Concentric hypertrophy is due to pressure overload, while eccentric hypertrophy is due to volume overload.

== Pathophysiology ==
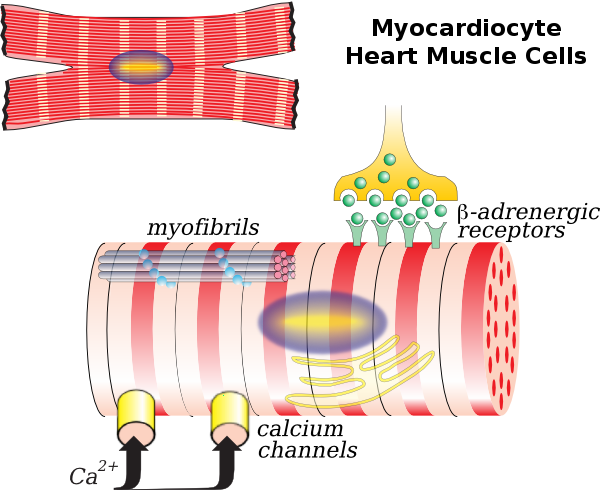
Myocardiocyte

The cardiac myocyte is the major cell involved in remodeling. Fibroblasts, collagen, the interstitium, and the coronary vessels to a lesser extent, also play a role. A common scenario for remodeling is after myocardial infarction. There is myocardial necrosis (cell death) and disproportionate thinning of the heart. This thin, weakened area is unable to withstand the pressure and volume load on the heart in the same manner as the other healthy tissue. As a result, there is dilatation of the chamber arising from the infarct region. The initial remodeling phase after a myocardial infarction results in repair of the necrotic area and myocardial scarring that may, to some extent, be considered beneficial since there is an improvement in or maintenance of LV function and cardiac output. Over time, however, as the heart undergoes ongoing remodeling, it becomes less elliptical and more spherical. Ventricular mass and volume increase, which together adversely affect cardiac function. Eventually, diastolic function, or the heart's ability to relax between contractions may become impaired, further causing decline.

After a myocardial infarction (MI), cardiac myocyte death can be triggered by necrosis, apoptosis, or autophagy, leading to thinning of the cardiac wall. The surviving cardiac myocytes either arrange in parallel or in series to each other, contributing to ventricular dilatation or ventricular hypertrophy, depending on the loading stress on the ventricular wall. Besides, reduced expression of V1 myosin and L-type calcium channels on cardiac myocytes are also thought to cause cardiac remodeling. Under normal body conditions, fatty acid accounts for 60 to 90% of the energy supply of the heart. Post MI, as fatty acid oxidation decreases, it leads to reduced energy supply for the cardiac myocytes, accumulation of fatty acids to toxic levels, and dysfunction of mitochondria. These consequences also led to the increase in oxidative stress on the heart, causing the proliferation of fibroblasts, activation of metalloproteinases, and induction of apoptosis, which would be explained below. Besides, inflammatory immune response after MI also contributes to the above changes.

Besides, the cardiac interstitium which consisted of largely Type I and Type III collagen fibres are also involved in cardiac remodeling. Cardiac collagen is synthesized by fibroblasts and degraded by metalloproteinases. Fibroblasts are activated post MI, leading to increased collagen synthesis and fibrosis of the heart. Increase expression of MMP1 and MMP9 led to degradation of collagen fibres, and subsequently dilatation of the heart. Several signal pathways such as Angiotensin II, Transforming growth factor beta (TGF-beta), and Endothelin 1 are known to trigger synthesis and degradation of collagen fibres in the heart.

Other factors such as high blood pressure, activation of sympathetic system which releases norepinephrine, activation of renin–angiotensin system which releases renin and anti-diuretic hormones are important contributors of cardiac remodelling. However, atrial natriuretic peptide is thought to be cardio-protective.

== Evaluation ==
Remodeling of the heart is evaluated by performing an echocardiogram. The size and function of the atria and ventricles can be characterized using this test.

== Treatment ==
Many factors influence the time course and extent of remodeling, including the severity of the injury, secondary events (recurrent ischemia or infarction), neurohormonal activation, genetic factors and gene expression, and treatment. Medications may attenuate remodeling. Angiotensin-converting enzyme (ACE) inhibitors have been consistently shown to decrease remodeling in animal models or transmural infarction and chronic pressure overload. Clinical trials have shown that ACE inhibitor therapy after myocardial infarction leads to improved myocardial performance, improved ejection fraction, and decreased mortality compared to patients treated with placebo. Likewise, inhibition of aldosterone, either directly or indirectly, leads to improvement in remodeling. Carvedilol, a 3rd generation beta blocker, may actually reverse the remodeling process by reducing left ventricular volumes and improving systolic function. Cardiac resynchronization therapy (CRT) has shown the ability to reverse left ventricular remodeling in some patients. Early correction of congenital heart defects, if appropriate, may prevent remodeling, as will treatment of chronic hypertension or valvular heart disease. Often, reverse remodeling, or improvement in left ventricular function, will also be seen.

== See also ==
- Dor procedure
- Athlete's heart
