= Athletic heart syndrome =

Athlete's heart
- Other names: Athlete's heart, athletic bradycardia, exercise-induced cardiomegaly
- The human heart
- Specialty: Sports cardiology

Athletic heart syndrome (AHS; also called athlete's heart, athletic bradycardia, or exercise-induced cardiomegaly) is a non-pathological condition commonly seen in sports medicine in which the human heart is enlarged, and the resting heart rate is lower than normal.

Athlete's heart is associated with physiological cardiac remodeling as a consequence of repetitive cardiac loading. Athlete's heart is common in athletes who routinely exercise more than an hour a day, and occurs primarily in endurance athletes, though it can occasionally arise in heavy weight trainers. The condition is generally considered benign, but may occasionally hide a serious medical condition, or may even be mistaken for one.

== Signs and symptoms ==
Athlete's heart most often does not have any physical symptoms, although an indicator would be a consistently low resting heart rate. Athletes with AHS often do not realize they have the condition unless they undergo specific medical tests, because athlete's heart is a normal, physiological adaptation of the body to the stresses of physical conditioning and aerobic exercise. People diagnosed with athlete's heart commonly display three signs that would usually indicate a heart condition when seen in a regular person: bradycardia, cardiomegaly, and cardiac hypertrophy.

Bradycardia is a slower than normal heartbeat, at around 40–60 beats per minute. Cardiomegaly is the state of an enlarged heart, and cardiac hypertrophy the thickening of the muscular wall of the heart, specifically the left ventricle, which pumps oxygenated blood to the aorta. Especially during an intensive workout, more blood and oxygen are required to the peripheral tissues of the arms and legs in highly trained athletes' bodies. A larger heart results in higher cardiac output, which may allow it to beat more slowly at rest, as more blood is pumped out with each beat.

Another sign of athlete's heart syndrome is an S3 gallop, which can be heard through a stethoscope. This sound can be heard as the diastolic pressure of the irregularly shaped heart creates a disordered blood flow. However, if an S4 gallop is heard, the patient should be given immediate attention. An S4 gallop is a stronger and louder sound created by the heart, if diseased in any way, and is typically a sign of a serious medical condition.

== Cause ==
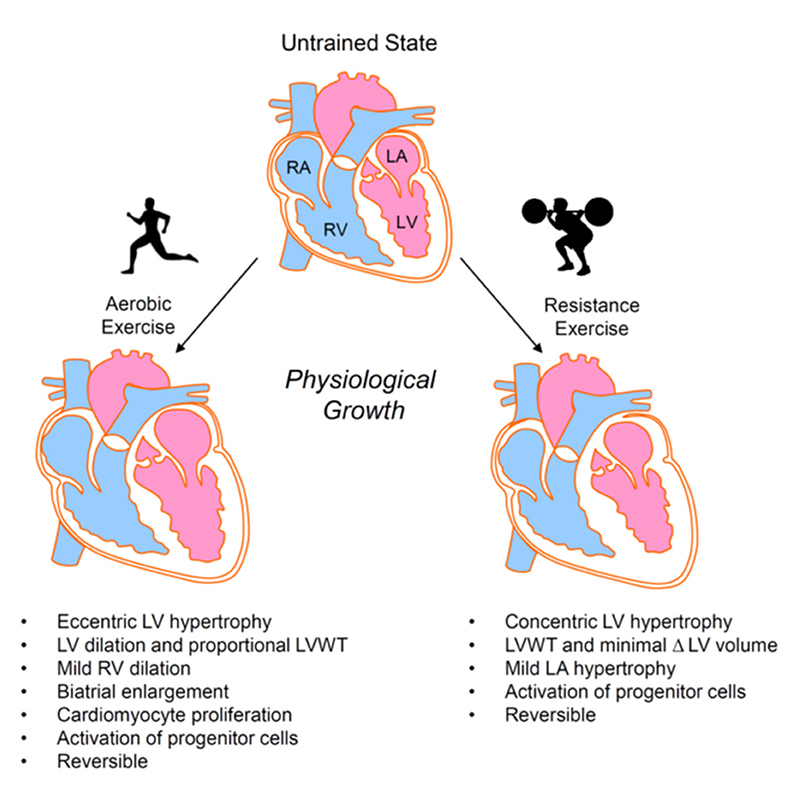
Aerobic/Endurance and Resistance/Strength exercise impact on cardiac remodeling and growth

Athlete's heart is a result of dynamic physical activity, such as aerobic training more than 5 hours a week rather than static training such as weightlifting. During intensive prolonged endurance or strength training, the body signals the heart to pump more blood through the body to counteract the oxygen deficit building in the skeletal muscles. Enlargement of the heart is a natural physical adaptation of the body to deal with the high pressures and large amounts of blood that can affect the heart during these periods of time. Over time, the body will increase both the chamber size of the left ventricle, and the muscle mass and wall thickness of the heart.

Cardiac output, the amount of blood that leaves the heart in a given time period (i.e. liters per minute), is proportional to both the chamber sizes of the heart and the rate at which the heart beats. With a larger left ventricle, the heart rate can decrease and still maintain a level of cardiac output necessary for the body. Therefore, athletes with AHS commonly have lower resting heart rates than nonathletes.

The heart becomes enlarged, or hypertrophic, due to intense cardiovascular workouts, creating an increase in stroke volume, an enlarged left ventricle (and right ventricle), and a decrease in resting heart rate along with irregular rhythms. The wall of the left ventricle increases in size by about 15–20% of its normal capacity. No decrease of the diastolic function of the left ventricle occurs. The athlete may also experience an irregular heartbeat and a resting pulse rate between 40 and 60 beats per minute (bradycardia).

The level of physical activity in a person determines what physiological changes the heart makes. The two types of exercise are static (strength-training) and dynamic (endurance-training). Static exercise consists of weight lifting and is mostly anaerobic, meaning the body does not rely on oxygen for performance. It also moderately increases heart rate and stroke volume (oxygen debt). Dynamic exercises include running, swimming, skiing, rowing, and cycling, which rely on oxygen from the body. This type of exercise also increases both heart rate and stroke volume of the heart. Both static and dynamic exercises involve the thickening of the left ventricular wall due to increased cardiac output, which leads to physiologic hypertrophy of the heart. Once athletes stop training, the heart returns to its normal size.

== Diagnosis ==
Athlete's heart is usually an incidental finding during a routine screening or during tests for other medical issues. An enlarged heart can be seen at echocardiography or sometimes on a chest X-ray. Similarities at presentation between athlete's heart and clinically relevant cardiac problems may prompt electrocardiography (ECG) and exercise cardiac stress tests. The ECG can detect sinus bradycardia, a resting heart rate of fewer than 60 beats per minute. This is often accompanied by sinus arrhythmia. The pulse of a person with athlete's heart can sometimes be irregular while at rest, but usually returns to normal after exercise begins.

Regarding differential diagnosis, left ventricular hypertrophy is usually indistinguishable from athlete's heart and at ECG, but can usually be discounted in the young and fit.

It is important to distinguish between athlete's heart and hypertrophic cardiomyopathy (HCM), a serious cardiovascular disease characterized by thickening of the heart's walls, which produces a similar ECG pattern at rest. This genetic disorder is found in one of 500 Americans and is a leading cause of sudden cardiac death in young athletes (although only about 8% of all cases of sudden death are actually exercise-related). The following table shows some key distinguishing characteristics of the two conditions.

Athlete's heart should not be confused with bradycardia that occurs secondary to relative energy deficiency in sport or anorexia nervosa, which involve slowing of metabolic rate and sometimes shrinkage of the heart muscle and reduced heart volume.

Feature	Athletic heart syndrome	Cardiomyopathy
Left ventricular hypertrophy	< 13 mm	> 15 mm
Left ventricular end-diastolic diameter	< 60 mm	> 70 mm
Diastolic function	Normal (E/A ratio > 1)	Abnormal (E/A ratio < 1; or pseudonormal E/A)
Septal hypertrophy	Symmetric	Asymmetric (in hypertrophic cardiomyopathy)
Family history	None	May be present
BP response to exercise	Normal	Normal or reduced systolic BP response
Deconditioning	Left ventricular hypertrophy regression	No left ventricular hypertrophy regression

The medical history of the patient (endurance sports) and physical examination (bradycardia, and maybe a third or fourth heart sound), can give important hints.

- ECG – typical findings in resting position are, for example, sinus bradycardia, atrioventricular block (primary and secondary) and incomplete (IRBBB) or complete right bundle branch block (RBBB) – all those findings normalize during exercise.
- Echocardiography – differentiation between physiological and pathological increases of the heart's size is possible, especially by estimating the mass of the wall (not over 130 g/m^{2}) and its end diastolic diameter (not much less 60 mm) of the left ventricle.
- X-ray examination of the chest may show increased heart size (mimicking other possible causes of enlargement).
- Cardiac MRI - In athlete's heart, there is balanced atrioventricular remodeling, reduced thickening of the heart after detraining, no late gadolinium enhancement, low to normal T1 signal, and normal extracellular volume.

== Screening related conditions ==
Because of several well-known and high-profile cases of athletes experiencing sudden unexpected death due to cardiac arrest, such as Reggie White and Marc-Vivien Foé, a growing movement is making an effort to have both professional and school-based athletes screened for cardiac and other related conditions, usually through a careful medical and health history, a good family history, a comprehensive physical examination including auscultation of heart and lung sounds and recording of vital signs such as heart rate and blood pressure, and increasingly, for better efforts at detection, such as an electrocardiogram.

An electrocardiogram (ECG) is a relatively straightforward procedure to administer and interpret, compared to more invasive or sophisticated tests; it can reveal or hint at many circulatory disorders and arrhythmias. Part of the cost of an ECG may be covered by some insurance companies, though routine use of ECGs or other similar procedures such as echocardiography (ECHO) are still not considered routine in these contexts. Widespread routine ECGs for all potential athletes during initial screening and then during the yearly physical assessment could well be too expensive to implement on a wide scale, especially in the face of the potentially very large demand. In some places, a shortage of funds, portable ECG machines, or qualified personnel to administer and interpret them (medical technicians, paramedics, nurses trained in cardiac monitoring, advanced practice nurses or nurse practitioners, physician assistants, and physicians in internal or family medicine or in some area of cardiopulmonary medicine) exist.

If sudden cardiac death occurs, it is usually because of pathological hypertrophic enlargement of the heart that went undetected or was incorrectly attributed to the benign "athletic" cases. Among the many alternative causes are episodes of isolated arrhythmias which degenerated into lethal VF and asystole, and various unnoticed, possibly asymptomatic cardiac congenital defects of the vessels, chambers, or valves of the heart. Other causes include carditis, endocarditis, myocarditis, and pericarditis whose symptoms were slight or ignored, or were asymptomatic.

The normal treatments for episodes due to the pathological look-alikes are the same mainstays for any other episode of cardiac arrest: cardiopulmonary resuscitation, defibrillation to restore normal sinus rhythm, and if initial defibrillation fails, administration of intravenous epinephrine or amiodarone. The goal is avoidance of infarction, heart failure, and/or lethal arrhythmias (ventricular tachycardia, ventricular fibrillation, asystole, or pulseless electrical activity), so ultimately to restore normal sinus rhythm.

== Management ==
Athlete's heart is not dangerous for athletes (though if a nonathlete has symptoms of bradycardia, cardiomegaly, and cardiac hypertrophy, another illness may be present). Athlete's heart is not the cause of sudden cardiac death during or shortly after a workout, which mainly occurs due to hypertrophic cardiomyopathy and arrhythmogenic cardiomyopathy (ARVC), two genetic disorders. Although a link between intensive exercise and exercise-induced arrhythmogenic right ventricular cardiomyopathy exists.

No treatment is required for people with athletic heart syndrome; it does not pose any physical threats to the athlete, and despite some theoretical concerns that the ventricular remodeling might conceivably predispose for serious arrhythmias, no evidence has been found of any increased risk of long-term events. Athletes should see a physician and receive a clearance to be sure their symptoms are due to athlete's heart and not another heart disease, such as cardiomyopathy. If the athlete is uncomfortable with having athlete's heart or if a differential diagnosis is difficult, deconditioning from exercise for a period of three months allows the heart to return to its regular size. However, one long-term study of elite-trained athletes found that dilation of the left ventricle was only partially reversible after a long period of deconditioning. This deconditioning is often met with resistance to the accompanying lifestyle changes. The real risk attached to athlete's heart is if athletes or nonathletes simply assume they have the condition, instead of making sure they do not have a life-threatening heart illness.

== History ==
The athlete's heart syndrome was first described in 1899 by Salomon Henschen. He compared the heart size of cross-country skiers to those who lived sedentary lives. He noticed that those who participated in competitive sports displayed symptoms of athlete's heart syndrome. Henschen believed the symptoms were a normal adjustment to exercise, and felt concern was not needed. Henschen believed that the entire heart became enlarged. He also believed athletes with AHS lived shorter lives than those who did not acquire the syndrome. Because his research occurred throughout the 19th century, technology was limited, and it became difficult to devise appropriate ways to measure the hearts of athletes. Few believed in Henschen's theory about athletes having larger hearts than those who did not participate in sports. The latter, however, in addition to Henschen's belief of an enlargement of the entire heart among athletes is in agreement with the four-chamber dilation seen with modern imaging modalities in individuals with athlete's heart.

== See also ==
- Exercise hypertension
