= Pressure overload =

Pathological state of cardiac muscle

Pressure overload of the right ventricle leads to right ventricular hypertrophy; right image.

Pressure overload refers to the pathological state of cardiac muscle in which it has to contract while experiencing an excessive afterload. Pressure overload may affect any of the four chambers of the heart, though the term is most commonly applied to one of the two ventricles. Chronic pressure overload leads to concentric hypertrophy of the cardiac muscle, which can in turn lead to heart failure, myocardial ischaemia or, in extreme cases, outflow obstruction.

== Signs and symptoms ==
A forceful apex beat indicates left ventricular pressure overload, while a right ventricular heave suggests right ventricular pressure overload. Other signs provide evidence for specific causes of pressure overload. Hypertension is diagnosed by sphygmomanometry. A narrow pulse pressure is a sign of aortic stenosis. The chest x-ray may show pulmonary hyperaemia in the case of pulmonary hypertension, and pulmonary oligemia in pulmonary stenosis. Pulmonary hypertension is also associated with chronic lung disease. Coarctation of the aorta presents with a significant difference in blood pressure between the upper and lower limbs, a systolic murmur or radiofemoral delay.

== Causes ==
Any obstruction to the outflow of one of the chambers of the heart can lead to pressure overload.

=== Left ventricular pressure overload ===
- Aortic stenosis
- Hypertension
- Coarctation of the aorta

=== Right ventricular pressure overload ===
- Pulmonary stenosis
- Pulmonary hypertension

== Treatment ==
Treatment will depend on the underlying cause. However, in general, symptomatic relief from pressure overload will not be achieved immediately, but will involve a delayed response following the atrophy of the hypertrophied heart muscle.

== See also ==
- Cardiac failure
- Afterload
- Volume overload
