= Exercise hypertension =

- Specialty: Cardiology

Exercise hypertension is an excessive rise in blood pressure during exercise. Many of those with exercise hypertension have spikes in systolic pressure to 250 mmHg or greater.

A rise in systolic blood pressure to over 200 mmHg when exercising at 100 W is pathological and a rise in pressure over 220 mmHg needs to be controlled by the appropriate drugs.

Similarly, in healthy individuals the response of the diastolic pressure to 'dynamic' exercise (e.g. walking, running or jogging) of moderate intensity is to remain constant or to fall slightly (due to the improved blood flow), but in some individuals a rise of 10 mmHg or greater is found.

Recent work at Johns Hopkins Medicine involving a group of athletes aged 55 to 75 with mild hypertension has found a correlation of those with exercise hypertension to a reduced ability of the major blood vessels to change in size in response to increased blood flow (probably due to impaired function of the endothelial cells in the vessel walls). This is to be differentiated from stiffness of the blood-vessel walls, which was not found to be correlated with the effect.
