= Left ventricular mass =

Mass of the left chamber of the heart

Left ventricular mass or LVM refers to the mass of the left ventricle of the heart.

Left ventricular mass index or LVMi is LVM divided by body surface area.

LVM is usually estimated using linear measurements obtained from echocardiography, but can also be calculated using CT or MRI images. LVM increases withe ageing, though ageing related remodeling of the left ventricle's geometry can lead to a discordancy between CT and echocardiographic based measurements of LVM.

Published normal ranges for LVMi are 49–115 g/m^{2} for men and 43–95 g/m^{2} for women. left ventricular hypertrophy (LVH) is defined as an abnormal increase in LVM, an important independent risk factor for cardiovascular morbidity and mortality. LVM is also an independent risk factor for cardiovascular disease even within the normal limits. A reduction in LVM following antihypertensive treatment or aortic valve replacement is associated with a reduced rate of complications.

Intensive athletic training can cause physiologic changes in the heart ("athlete's heart") which include an increase in LVM.
