= Volume overload =

Heart condition

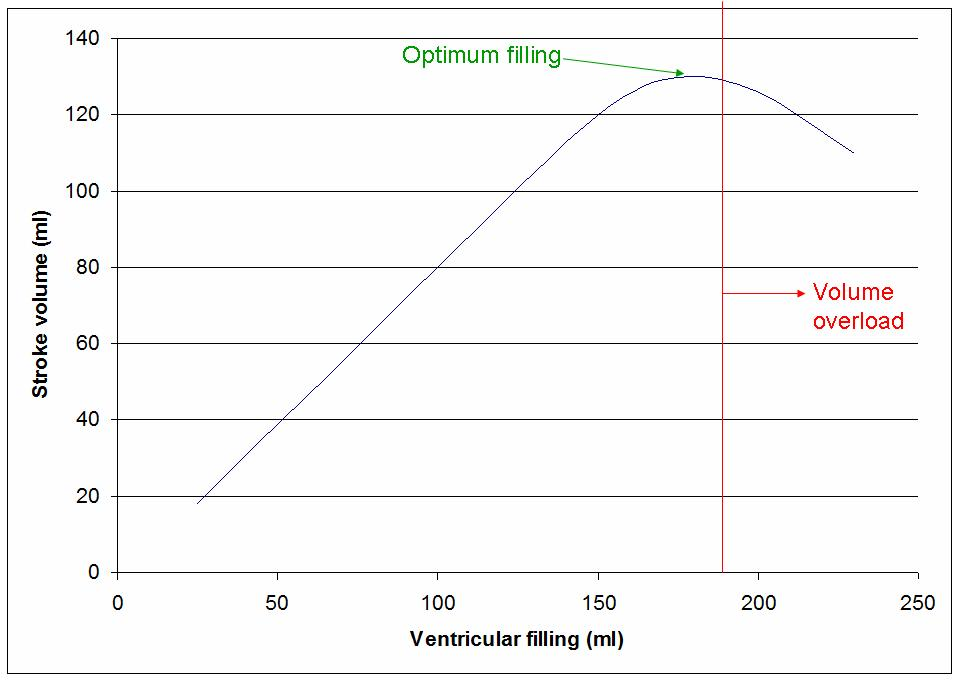
Representation of the cardiac response in stroke volume to left ventricular filling under normal conditions. There is an optimum end-diastolic volume at which maximum stroke volume and cardiac output is achieved. Beyond this, there is volume overload, and stroke volume is diminished.

Volume overload refers to the state of one of the chambers of the heart in which too large a volume of blood exists within it for it to function efficiently. Ventricular volume overload is approximately equivalent to an excessively high preload. It is a cause of cardiac failure.

== Pathophysiology ==
In accordance with the Frank–Starling law of the heart, the myocardium contracts more powerfully as the end-diastolic volume increases. Stretching of the myofibrils in cardiac muscle causes them to contract more powerfully due to a greater number of cross-bridges being formed between the myofibrils within cardiac myocytes. This is true up to a point, however beyond this there is a loss of contractile ability due to loss of connection between myofibrils; see figure.

Various pathologies, listed below, can lead to volume overload. Different mechanisms are involved depending on the cause, however the common theme is that of a high cardiac output with a low or normal afterload. The output may be high due to the inefficiency in valve disease, or it may be high due to shunting of blood in left-to-right shunts and arteriovenous malformations.

Left ventricular volume overload may produce inverted u waves on the electrocardiogram.

== Causes ==
Causes may be considered according to which chamber is affected.

Left ventricular volume overload

- Valvular heart disease
  - Aortic regurgitation
  - Mitral regurgitation, also causing left atrial volume overload
- Congenital heart defects
  - Patent ductus arteriosus
  - Ventricular septal defect, also causing left atrial volume overload
- Arteriovenous malformation and fistula
  - Giant hepatic haemangioma
  - High-output haemodialysis fistula

Right ventricular volume overload

- Valvular heart disease
  - Tricuspid regurgitation
  - Pulmonary regurgitation
- Congenital heart defects
  - Atrial septal defect, also causing right atrial volume overload

== See also ==
- Cardiac failure
- Frank–Starling law of the heart
- Preload (cardiology)
- Pressure overload
