= Concentric hypertrophy =

Hypertrophic growth of a hollow organ without overall enlargement

Concentric hypertrophy is a hypertrophic growth of a hollow organ without overall enlargement, in which the walls of the organ are thickened and its capacity or volume is diminished.

Sarcomeres are added in parallel, as for example occurs in hypertrophic cardiomyopathy.

In the heart, concentric hypertrophy is related to increased pressure overload of the heart, often due to hypertension and/or aortic stenosis. The consequence is a decrease in ventricular compliance and diastolic dysfunction, followed eventually by ventricular failure and systolic dysfunction.

Laplace's law for a sphere states wall stress (T) is proportionate to the product of the transmural pressure (P) and cavitary radius (r) and inversely proportionate to wall thickness (W): In response to the pressure overload left ventricular wall thickness markedly increases—while the cavitary radius remains relatively unchanged. These compensatory changes, termed "concentric hypertrophy," reduce the increase in wall tension observed in aortic stenosis.
