= Hypertrophy =

Increase in the size of biological cells

- Hypertrophy results from an increase in cell size, whereas hyperplasia stems from an increase in cell number.

Hypertrophy is an increase in the size of individual cells. In multicellular organisms, growth is typically achieved through a combination of this cellular enlargement and hyperplasia, which is an increase in the number of cells. While distinct processes, they often occur concurrently. Hypertrophy can lead to a relative increase in the volume of a tissue or organ, and contributes to the overall growth of an organism. In organisms characterized by eutely, where the total number of somatic cells is fixed upon reaching maturity, post-embryonic growth is achieved almost exclusively through hypertrophy. In humans and other mammals, hypertrophy is a normal physiological process, such as the hormonally induced enlargement of uterine cells during pregnancy.

== Clinical significance in humans ==
Eccentric hypertrophy is a type of hypertrophy in which the walls and chamber of a hollow organ undergo growth, resulting in an overall increase in size and volume. It is most commonly described in the left ventricle of the heart. Sarcomeres are added in series, as for example in dilated cardiomyopathy (in contrast to hypertrophic cardiomyopathy, a type of concentric hypertrophy, where sarcomeres are added in parallel).

== Gallery ==
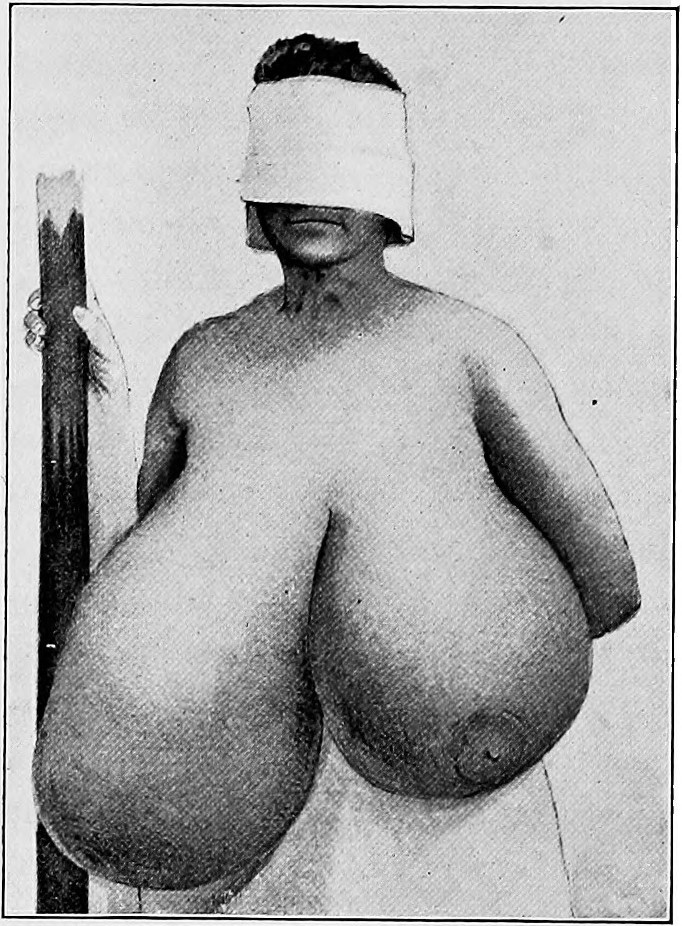
Breasts

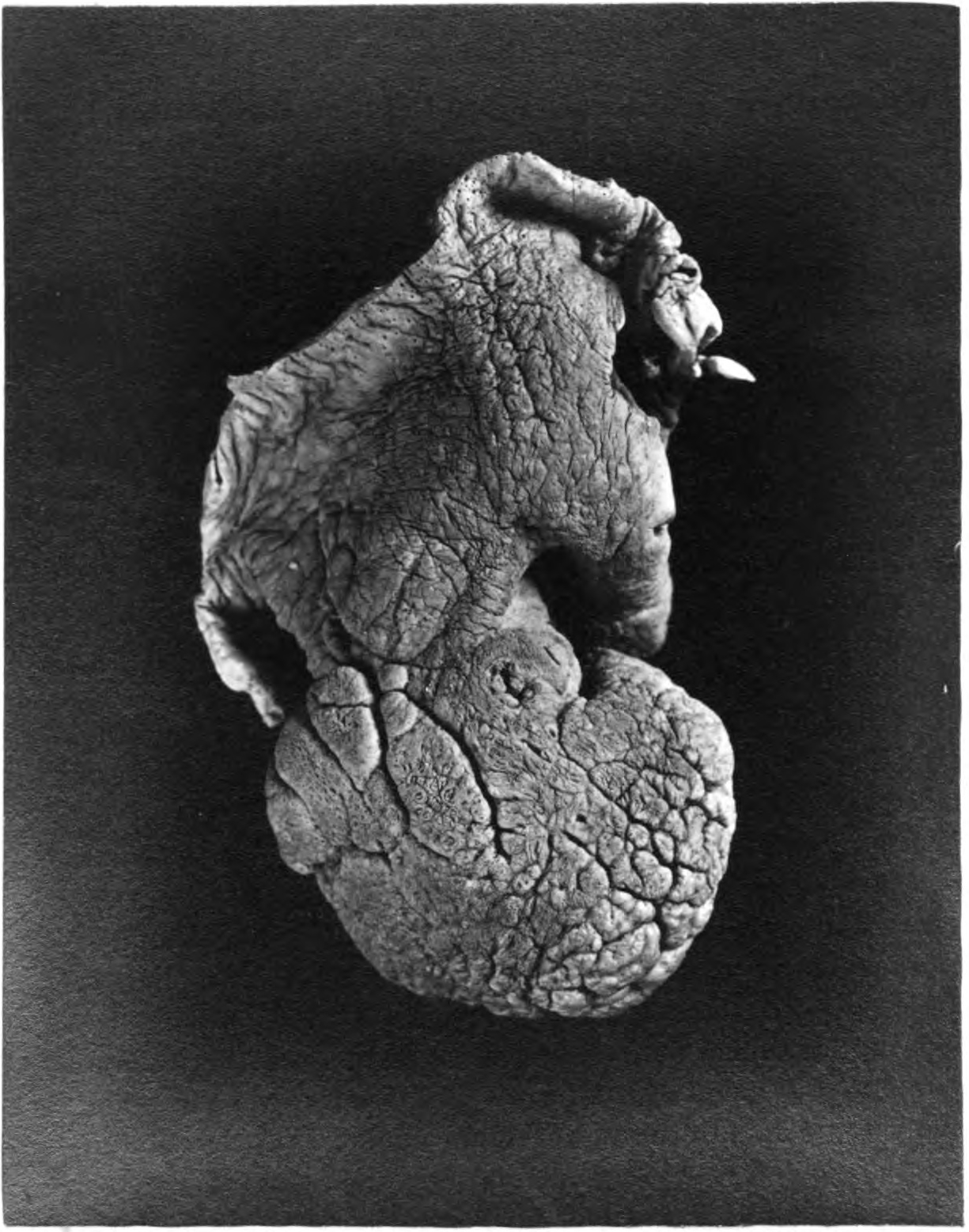
Clitoris

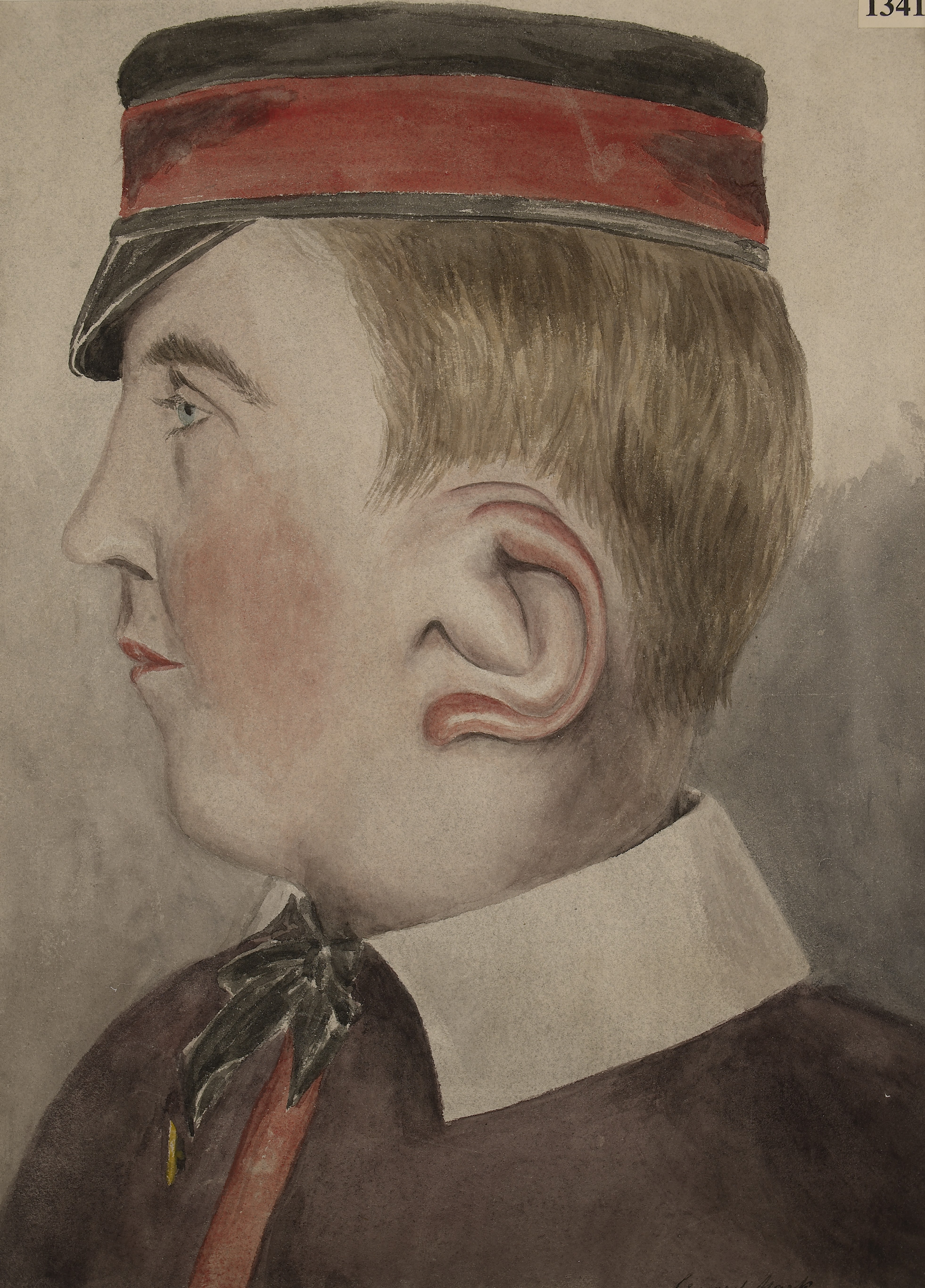
Ear

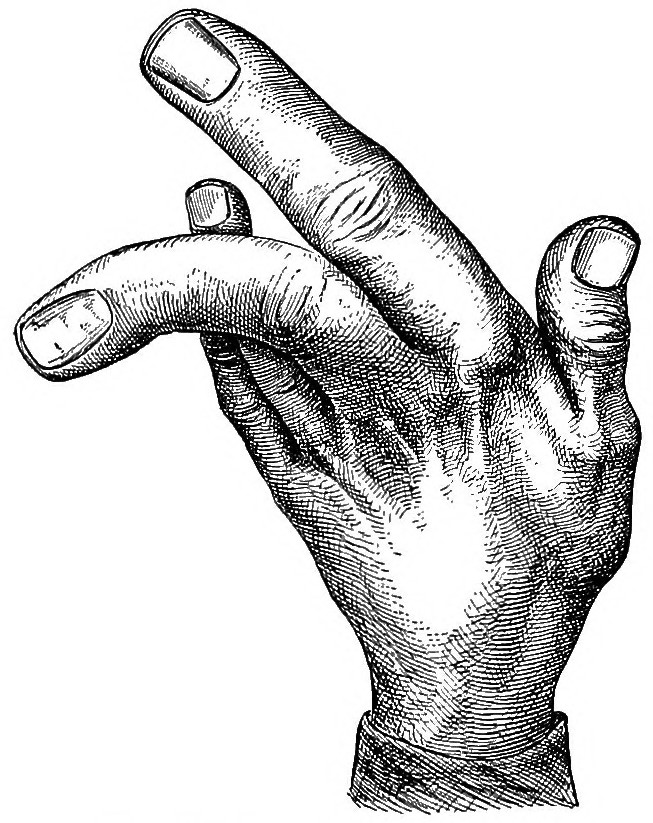
Fingers

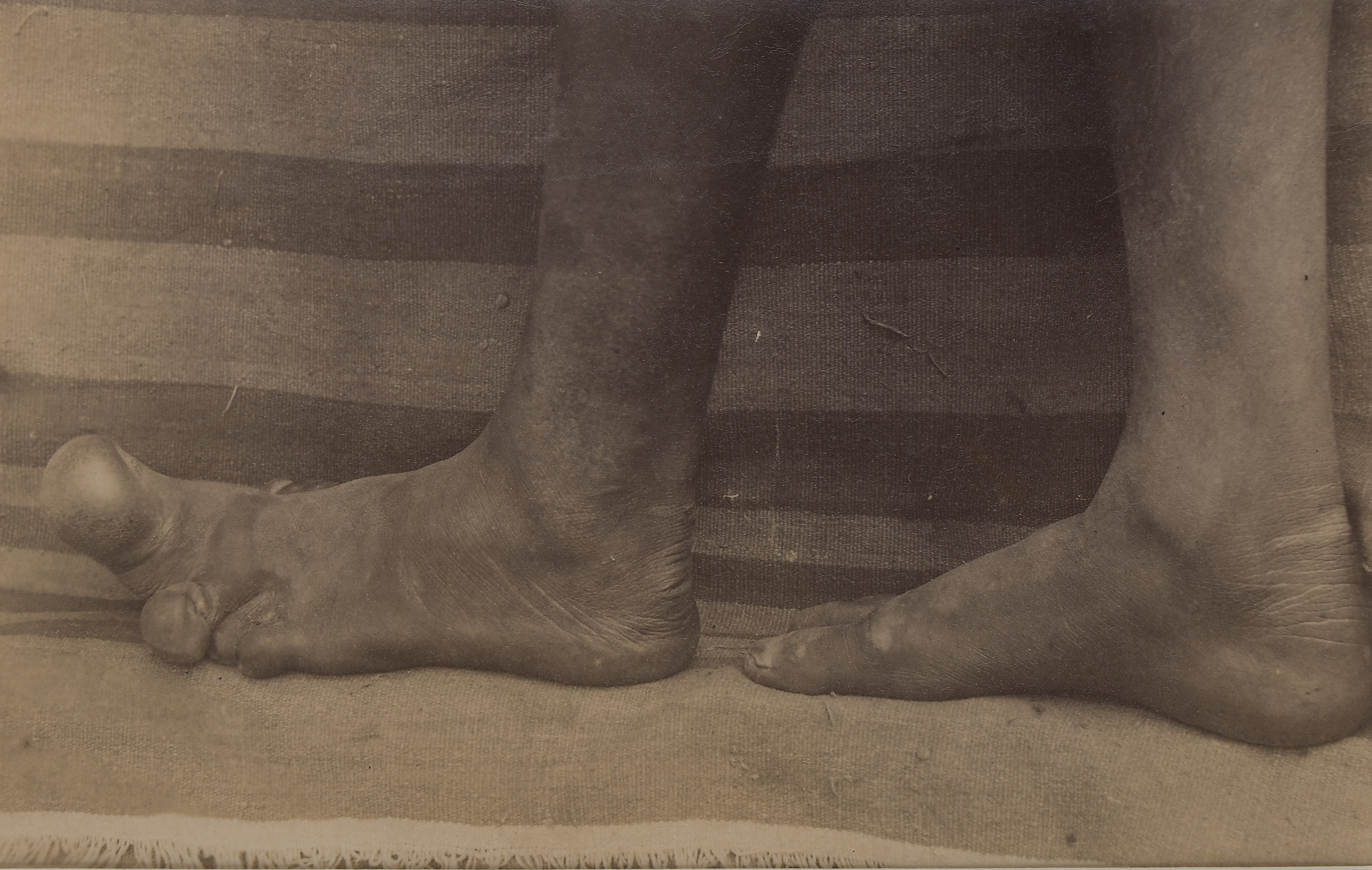
Foot (partial)

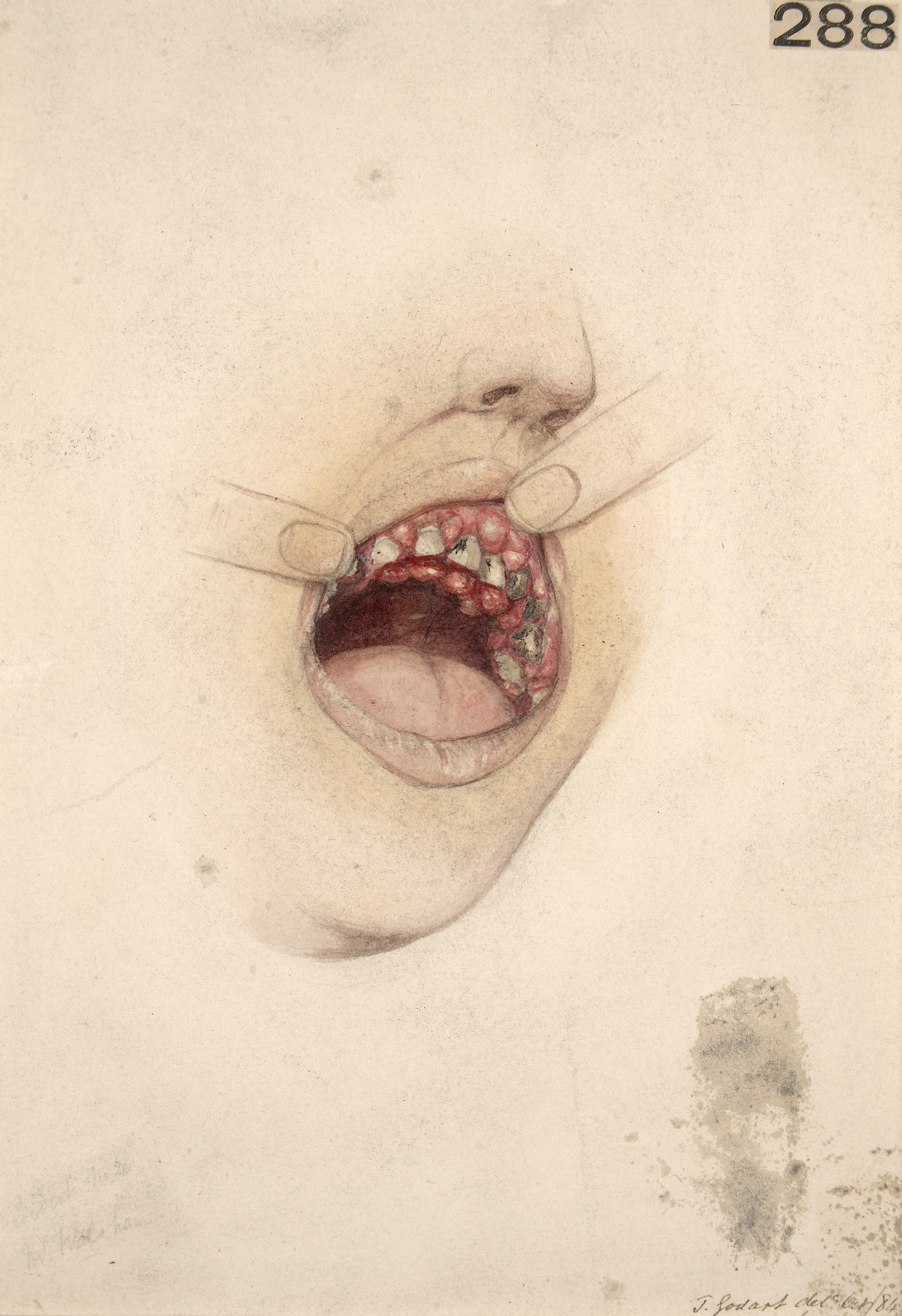
Gums

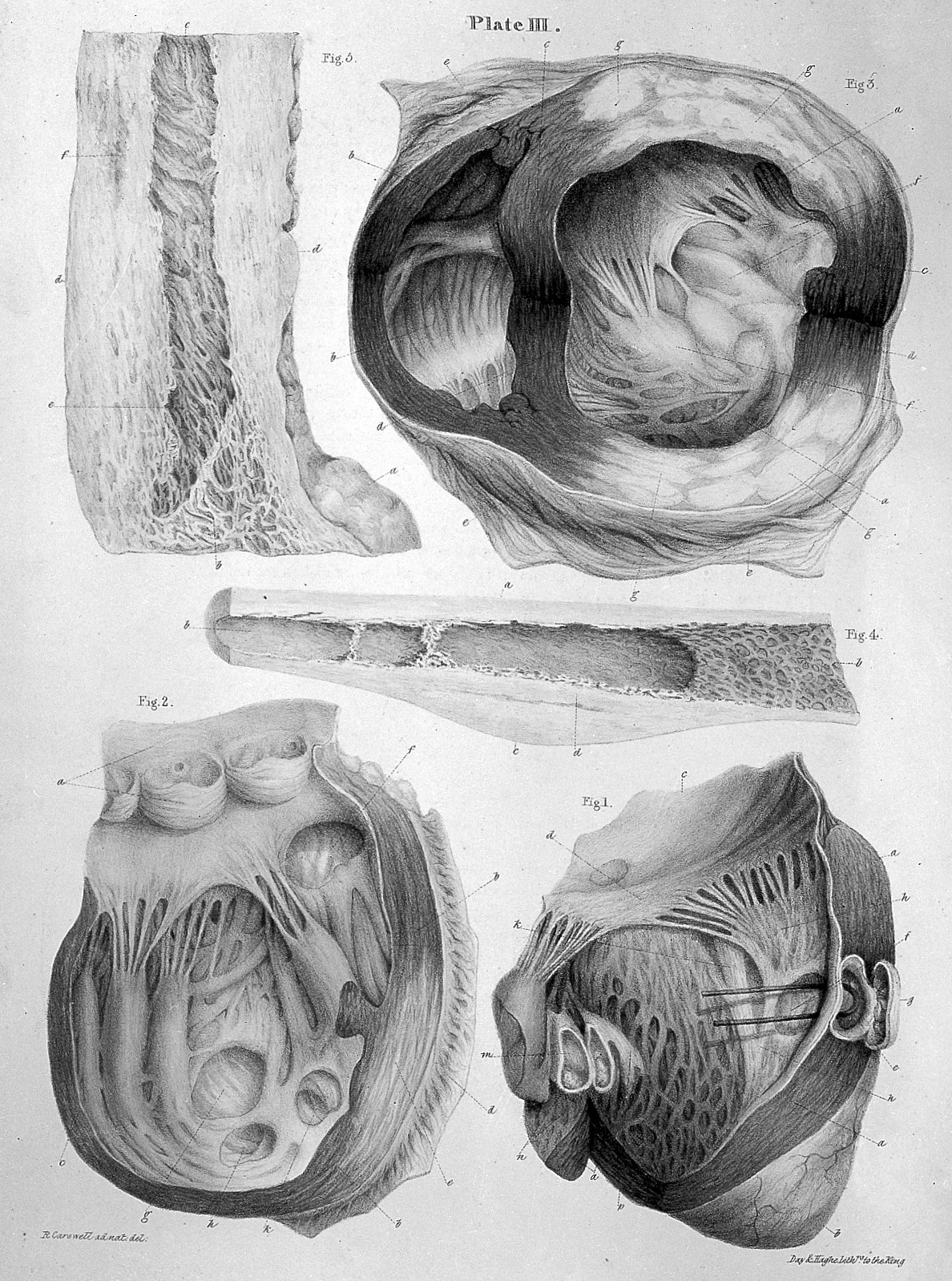
Heart

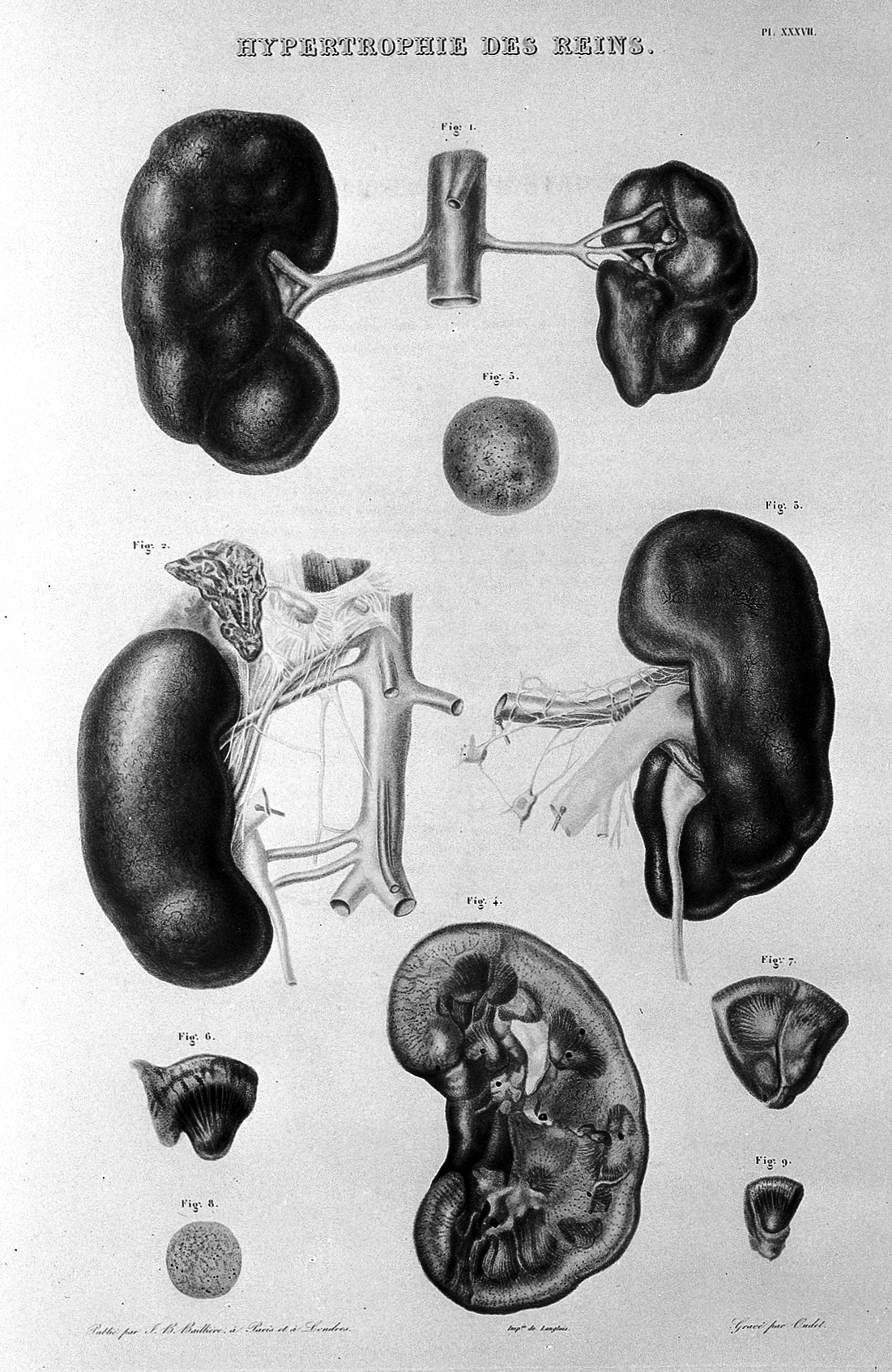
Kidneys

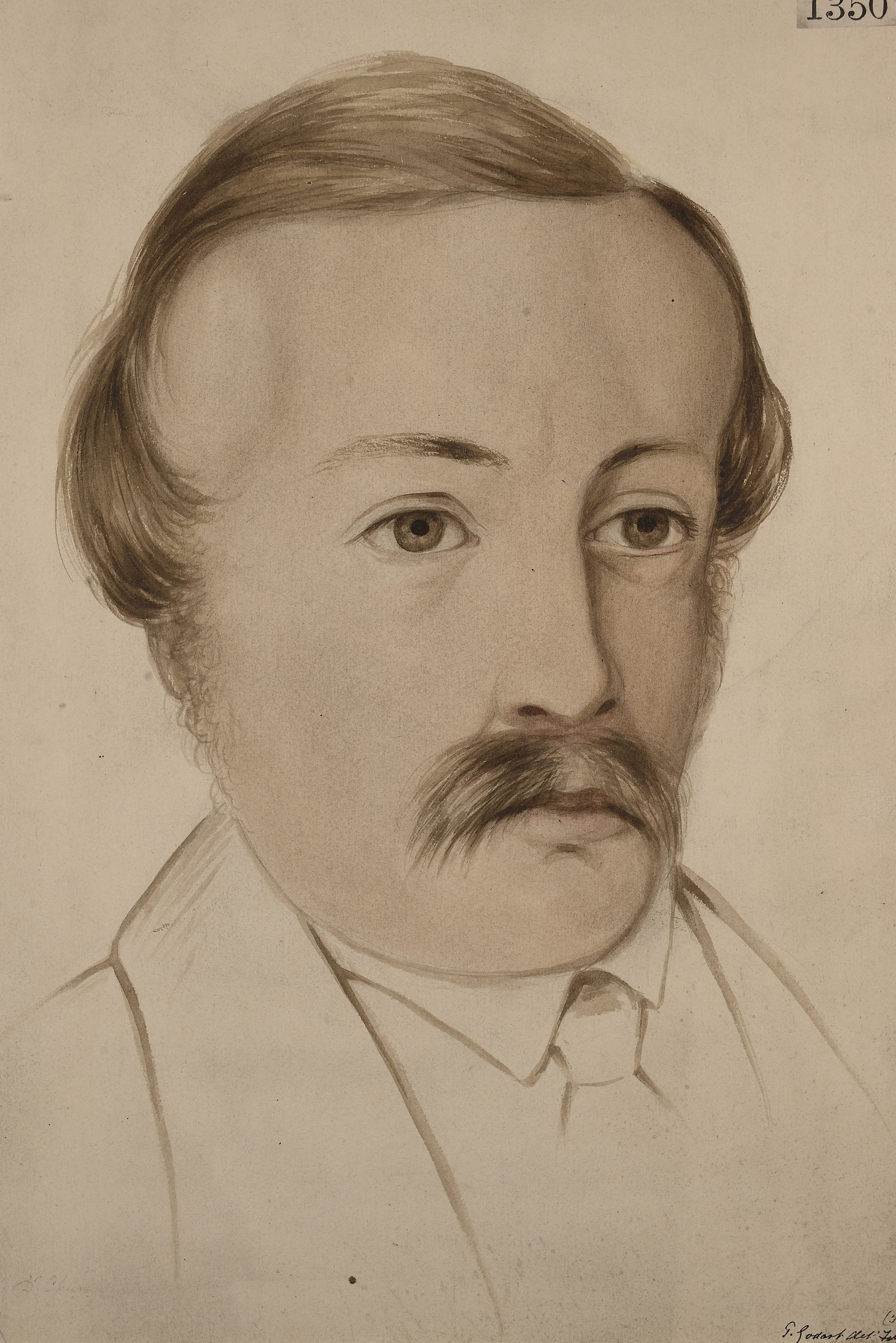
Temporal muscles

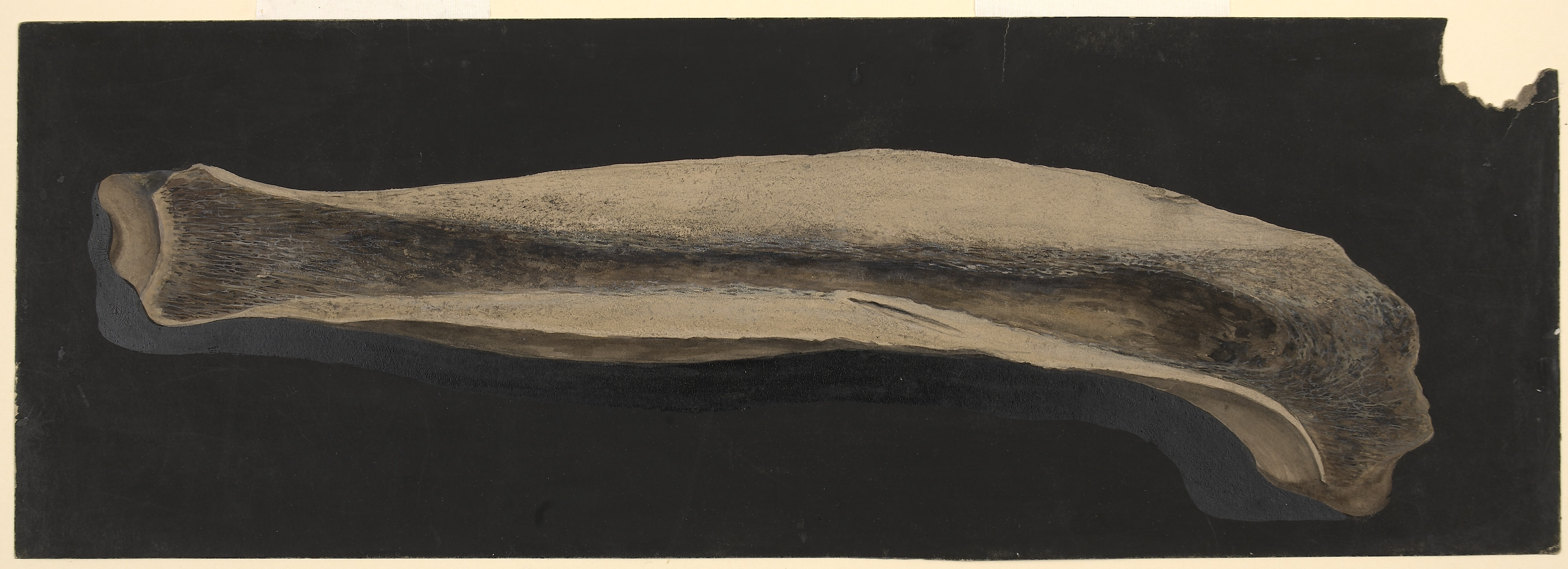
Tibia (inflammatory)

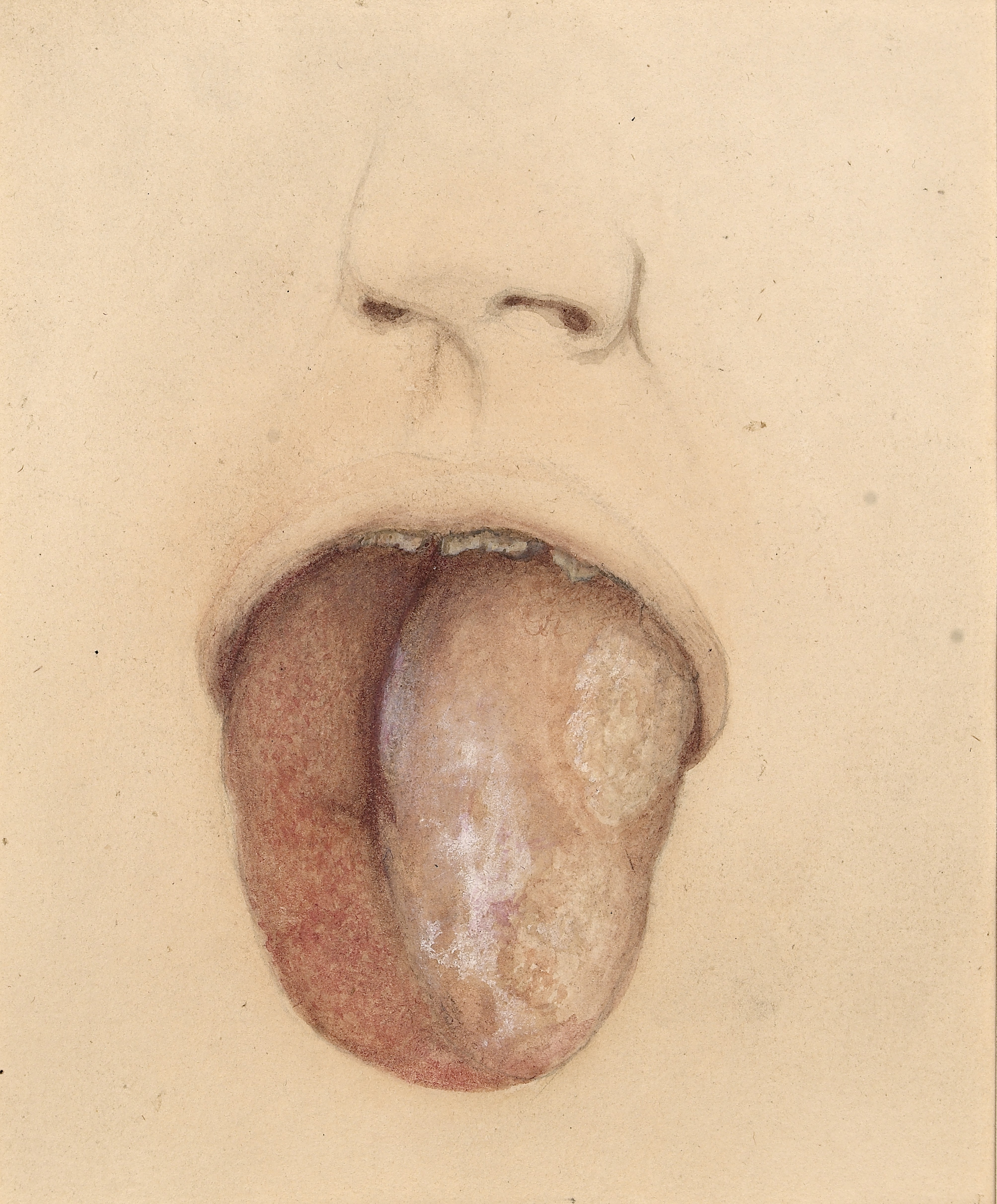
Tongue (inflammatory)

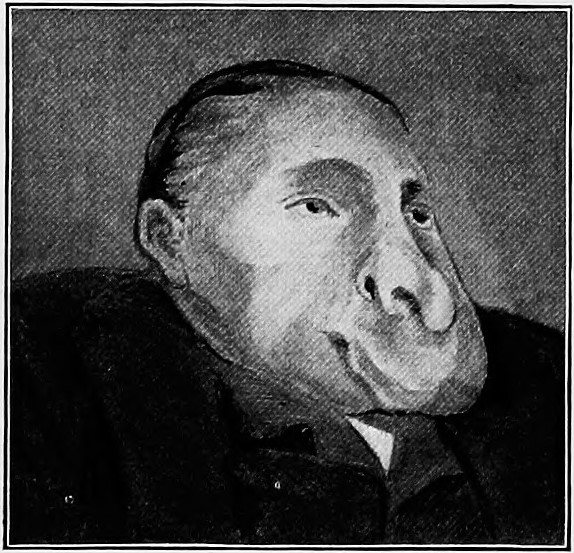
Upper lip

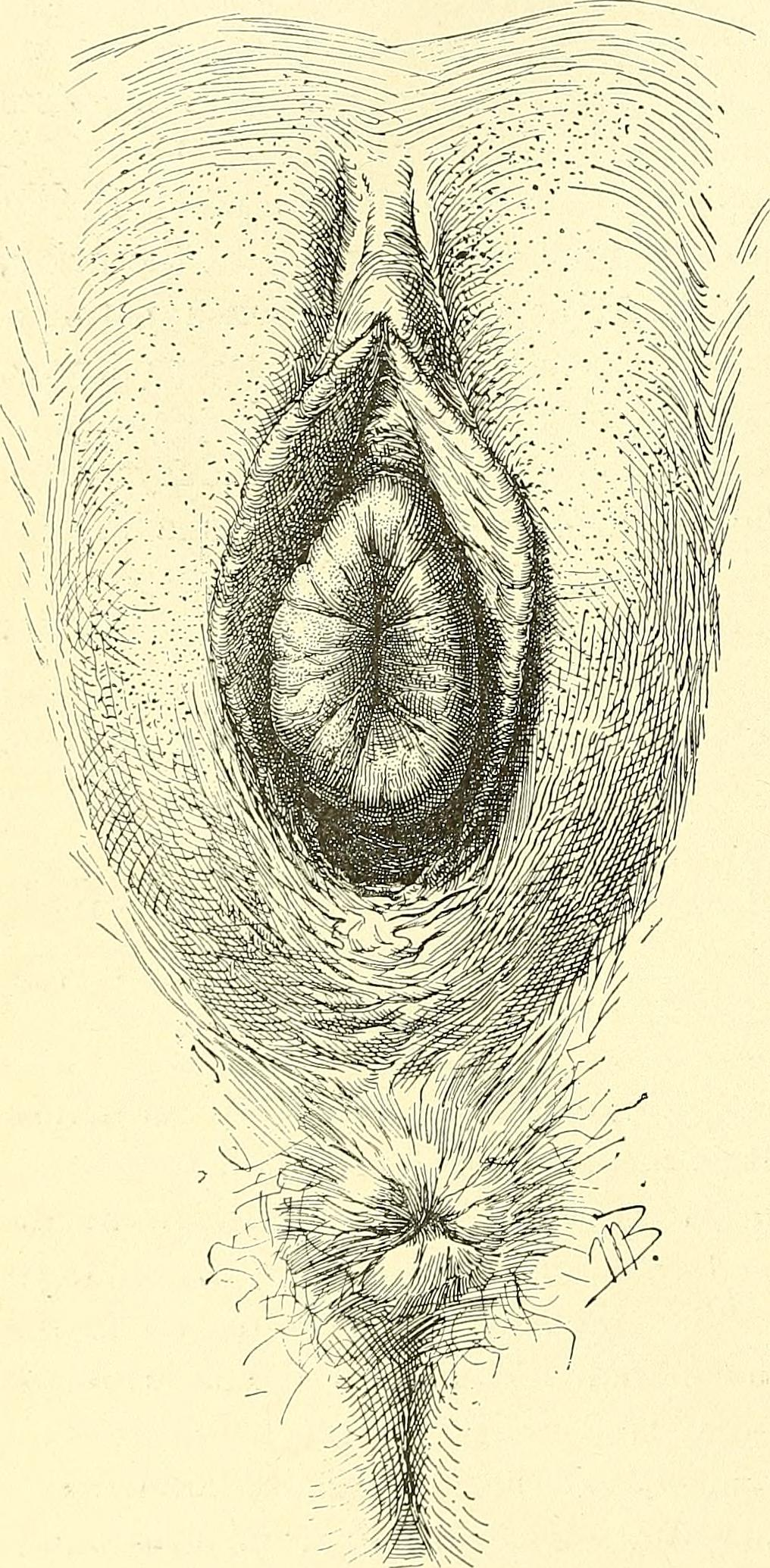
Urethral meatus

== See also ==
- Athlete's heart
- Ventricular hypertrophy (including left ventricular hypertrophy and right ventricular hypertrophy)
- Muscle hypertrophy
- List of biological development disorders
