= Diastolic function =

In clinical cardiology the term "diastolic function" is most commonly referred as how the heart fills. Parallel to "diastolic function", the term "systolic function" is usually referenced in terms of the left ventricular ejection fraction (LVEF), which is the ratio of stroke volume and end-diastolic volume. Due to the epidemic of heart failure, particularly the cases determined as diastolic heart failure, it is increasingly urgent and crucial to understand the meaning of “diastolic function”. Unlike "systolic function", which can be simply evaluated by LVEF, there are no established dimensionless parameters for "diastolic function" assessment. Hence to further study "diastolic function" the complicated and speculative physiology must be taken into consideration.

How the heart works during its filling period still has many misconceptions remaining. To better understand diastolic function, it is crucial to realize that the left ventricle is a mechanical suction pump at, and for a little while after, the mitral valve opening. In other words, when mitral valve opens, the atrium does not push blood into the ventricle, instead, it is the ventricle that mechanically "sucks" in blood from the atrium. The energy that drives the suction process is generated from phase of systole. During systole, to overcome the peripheral arterial load at ejection, ventricle contracts, which also compresses elastic tissues internal to and external to the myocardium. Then, when cardiac muscle relaxes, the energy captured by compressed elements releases, driving the recoil of ventricular wall until a new balanced equilibrium state is reached.

During diastole, the ventricle of heart must remain elastic or compliant enough and have capacity to hold incoming blood to guarantee effectiveness of the filling phase. Hence stiffness and relaxation are ventricle's intrinsic feature parameters that are practical in evaluating and quantifying diastolic function. In addition, volumetric load serves as an extrinsic indicating parameter that modulates diastolic function.

== Measurement ==
The most established index to describe left ventricular diastolic function is Tau, left ventricular diastolic time constant. Measurement of Tau is traditionally delivered in a catheter lab by an invasive method. Recently, non-invasive measurement of Tau is available for mitral regurgitation or aortic regurgitation patients in an Echo lab.

There have been many attempts intending for extracting both intrinsic and extrinsic properties. Early attempts concentrated on pulse-wave Doppler-echo measured trans-mitral flow velocity contours.

In terms of filling, diastolic intervals consist of early rapid filling E-waves followed by diastasis and followed by atrial systole-generated A-waves. Empirically, E- and A- wave contours were simplified as triangles. Nowadays, triangle-based indexes, such as the peak velocities of the E- and A-waves and ratio of them, the deceleration time and time duration of the E-wave, and the velocity time integral of both E- and A- waves, are usually measured and evaluated.

The triangular approach applies to E-wave shape conveniently, especially in the past when the images rendered by technology back in days are of poor resolution quality. Nevertheless, with rapidly improving temporal resolution and image processing capabilities, the curvature of E-wave contours can be clearly identified with detailed information revealed.

Due to advancement of modern medical imaging technology, the measurement of even smaller (i.e. tissue) velocities are possible to be made, which even leads to capability to measure the longitudinal displacements of the mitral annulus. The shapes of mitral annular velocity contours used to be approximated to be triangles, whose peak height is label to be E’. E’ proved useful in selected patient populations for estimation of end-diastolic pressure (EDP).

Other innovative imaging modalities consist of techniques such as speckle tracking. Speckle tracking enables strain and strain-rate measurements. It is a relatively recent instance of technological progress, due to the fact that it relies on the information content inherent in the seemingly random arrangement of bright speckles present in all echocardiographic images. Even though a variety of echo-based imaging technologies represent multiple levels of research innovation, much remains to be studied in relation to how to interpret the recorded data embedded in images.
