= Phonocardiogram =

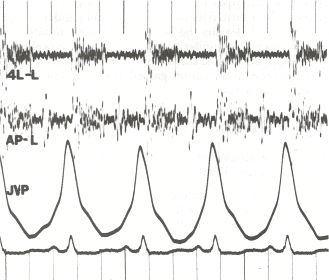
- Phonocardiogram and jugular venous pulse tracing from a middle-aged man with pulmonary hypertension (pulmonary artery pressure 70 mm Hg) caused by cardiomyopathy. The jugular venous pulse tracing demonstrates a prominent a wave without a c or v wave being observed. The phonocardiograms (fourth left interspace and cardiac apex) show a murmur of tricuspid insufficiency and ventricular and atrial gallops.
- Synonyms: PCG
- ICD-9-CM: 89.55

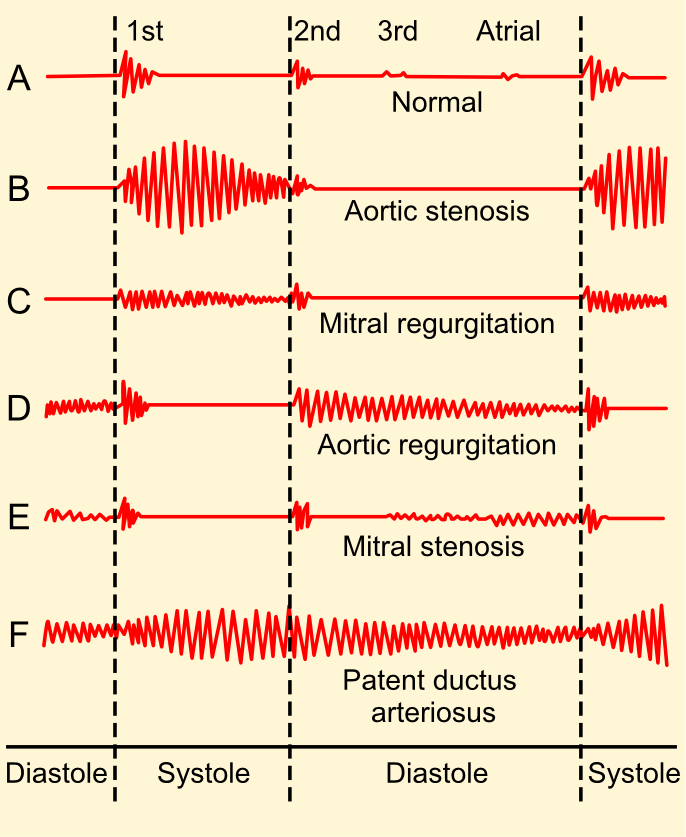
Phonocardiograms of common murmurs.

A phonocardiogram (or PCG) is a plot of high-fidelity recording of the sounds and murmurs made by the heart with the help of the machine called the phonocardiograph; thus, phonocardiography is the recording of all the sounds made by the heart during a cardiac cycle.

== Medical use ==
Wiggers diagram of various events of a cardiac cycle, including a phonocardiogram at bottom.

Heart sounds result from vibrations created by the closure of the heart valves. There are at least two; the first (S1) is produced when the atrioventricular valves (tricuspid and mitral) close at the beginning of systole and the second (S2) when the aortic valve and pulmonary valve (semilunar valves) close at the end of systole. Phonocardiography allows the detection of subaudible sounds and murmurs and makes a permanent record of these events. In contrast, the stethoscope cannot always detect all such sounds or murmurs and provides no record of their occurrence. The ability to quantitate the sounds made by the heart provides information not readily available from more sophisticated tests and provides vital information about the effects of certain drugs on the heart. It is also an effective method for tracking the progress of a patient's disease.

=== Discrete and the packet wavelet transform ===
According to a review by Cherif et al., discrete wavelet transform (DWT) is better at not affecting S1 or S2 while filtering heart murmurs. Packet wavelet transform affects internal components structure much more than DWT does.

== History ==
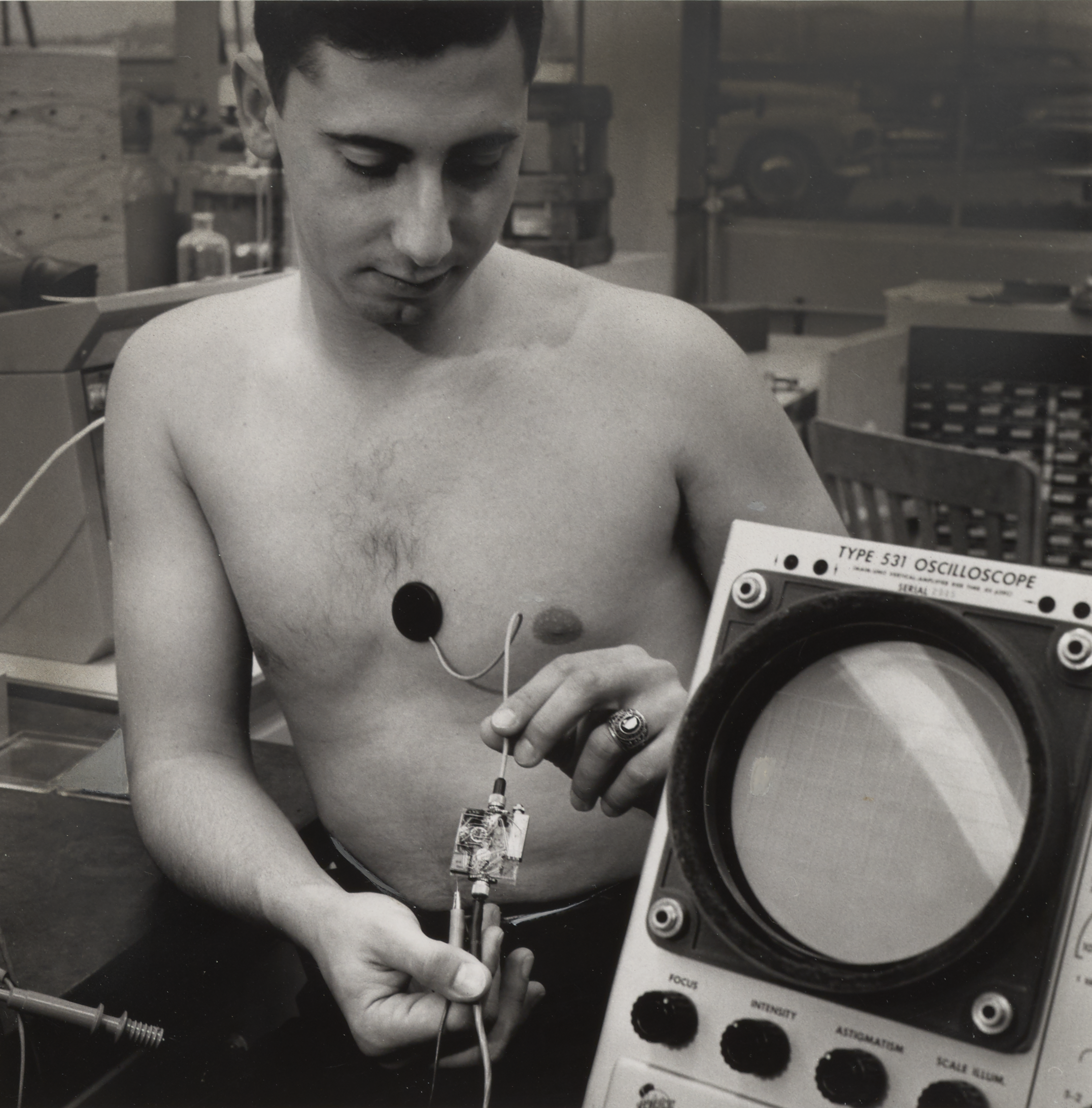
William Birnbaum with a Phonocardiogram System for use in Project Gemini, 1965

Awareness of the sounds made by the heart dates to ancient times. The idea of developing an instrument to record it may date back to Robert Hooke (1635–1703), who wrote: "There may also be a possibility of discovering the internal motions and actions of bodies - whether animal, vegetable, or mineral, by the sound they make". The earliest known examples of phonocardiography date to the 1800s.

Monitoring and recording equipment for phonocardiography was developed through the 1930s and 1940s. Standardization began by 1950, when the first international conference was held in Paris.

A phonocardiogram system manufactured by Beckman Instruments was used on at least one of the Project Gemini crewed spaceflights (1965–1966) to monitor the heartbeat of astronauts on the flight. It was one of many Beckman Instruments specialized for and used by NASA.

John Keefer filed a patent for a phonocardiogram simulator in 1970 while he was an employee of the U.S. government. The original patent description indicates that it is a device which via electrical voltage mimics the human heart's sounds.

== Fetal Phonocardiogram ==
A fetal phonocardiogram (or fPCG) is a specialized application of phonocardiography designed to be a non-invasive diagnostic technique to capture the sounds of the fetal heart in utero. These fetal phonocardiograms can be analyzed to detect any abnormalities in the fetal heart. Fetal phonocardiography has become an important tool in prenatal care, as it allows clinicians to detect and monitor potential heart problems in the fetus before birth.

The use of phonocardiography to study the fetal heart dates back to the 1960s, when researchers first began to explore the feasibility of detecting fetal heart sounds using external microphones. Early studies focused on using phonocardiography to measure fetal heart rate and rhythm. Over time, advances in technology and techniques have enabled researchers to use fetal phonocardiography to detect a wider range of fetal heart abnormalities. Fetal phonocardiography is typically performed during routine prenatal visits, starting around 18–20 weeks of gestation. The procedure involves placing a small microphone on the mother's abdomen over the fetal heart. The microphone captures the sounds of the fetal heart, which are then amplified and recorded for analysis. Khandoker et al. developed a multi-channel fetal phonocardiogram (fPCG) with four sound transducers applied in a simple and consistent pattern across the maternal abdomen. The intellectual property (IP) technology license was given to the home-based monitoring device, the Emirati startup, that helps pregnant mothers monitor fetal heartbeat and the baby's cardiac activity.

== See also ==
- EKG
- Echocardiogram
