= Isovolumetric contraction =

Cardiac event during a heartbeat's early systole stage

Wiggers diagram of the cardiac cycle, with isometric contraction marked at upper left.

In cardiac physiology, isometric contraction is an event occurring in early systole during which the ventricles contract with no corresponding volume change (isometrically). This short-lasting portion of the cardiac cycle takes place while all heart valves are closed. The inverse operation is isovolumetric relaxation diastole with all valves optimally closed.

== Description ==
In a healthy young adult, blood enters the atria and flows to the ventricles via the opened atrioventricular valves (tricuspid and mitral valves). Atrial contraction rapidly follows, actively pumping about 30% of the returning blood. As diastole ends, the ventricles begin depolarizing and, while ventricular pressure starts to rise owing to contraction, the atrioventricular valves close in order to prevent backflow to the atria. At this stage, which corresponds to the R peak or the QRS complex seen on an ECG, the semilunar valves (aortic and pulmonary valves) are also closed. The net result is that, while contraction causes ventricular pressures to rise sharply, there is no overall change in volume because of the closed valves. The isovolumetric contraction phase lasts about 0.05 seconds, but this short period of time is enough to build up a sufficiently high pressure that eventually overcomes that of the aorta and the pulmonary artery upon opening of the semilunar valves. This process, therefore, helps maintain the correct unidirectional flow of blood through the heart and circulatory system.

== Etymology ==
The word contains the prefix iso-, derived from the Ancient Greek ἴσος (ísos), meaning equal. Therefore, an isovolumetric contraction is one in which the volume of fluid remains constant.

== See also ==
- Isovolumetric relaxation
- Cardiac cycle
- Blood pressure
- Wiggers diagram
