= Diastasis =

Diastasis may refer to:

- Diastasis (pathology) is the separation of parts of the body that are normally joined, such as the separation of certain abdominal muscles during pregnancy, or of adjacent bones without fracture
- Diastasis (physiology) is the middle stage of diastole during the cycle of a heartbeat
