= Isovolumic relaxation time =

Interval in the cycle of the human heart

Wiggers diagram of the cardiac cycle, with isovolumic relaxation marked at top

Isovolumic relaxation time (IVRT) is an interval in the cardiac cycle, from the aortic component of the second heart sound, that is, closure of the aortic valve, to onset of filling by opening of the mitral valve. It can be used as an indicator of diastolic dysfunction.

It can be measured by simultaneous Doppler echocardiography and M-mode sonography, or better still, by simultaneous phonocardiogram and transmitral Doppler.

Prolonged IVRT indicates poor myocardial relaxation. A normal IVRT is about 70 ± 12 ms, and approximately 10 ms longer in people over forty years. In abnormal relaxation, IVRT is usually in excess of 110 ms. With restrictive ventricular filling, it is usually under 60 ms.

== See also ==
- Isovolumetric contraction
