= Strain rate imaging =

- This clip shows the use of XStrain software to calculate the longitudinal peak systolic strain (LPSS) in all the segments of the right ventricle (RV) during a systole
- Purpose: measuring regional/global deformation of myocardium

Strain rate imaging is a method in echocardiography (medical ultrasound) for measuring regional or global deformation of the myocardium (heart muscle). The term "deformation" refers to the myocardium changing shape and dimensions during the cardiac cycle. If there is myocardial ischemia, or there has been a myocardial infarction, in part of the heart muscle, this part is weakened and shows reduced and altered systolic function. Also in regional asynchrony, as in bundle branch block, there is regional heterogeneity of systolic function. By strain rate imaging, the simultaneous function of different regions can be displayed and measured. The method was first based on colour tissue Doppler. by using the longitudinal myocardial velocity gradient, already in use transmurally. Later, the regional deformation has also been available by speckle tracking echocardiography, both methods having some, but different methodological weaknesses. Both methods, however, will acquire the same data (measurements may differ somewhat, however, being method dependent), and also can be displayed by the same type of display.

The point of deformation imaging, is that a passive segment in the myocardium for instance after an infarct, may move due to the action of an adjacent segment (tethering). Thus the displacement or velocity of a segment do not tell about the function of that segment. Deformation imaging, on the other hand, measures the differences of motion and velocity within the segment, which is equivalent to the deformation.

== Basic concepts ==
Strain means Deformation, and is defined as relative change in length. The Lagrangian formula ε_{L} = (L-L_{0})/L_{0} = ΔL/L_{0}, where L_{0} is baseline length and L is the resulting length, defines strain in relation to the original length as a dimensionless measure, where shortening will be negative, and lengthening will be positive. It is usually expressed in percent. An alternative definition, Eulerian strain defines the strain in relation to the instantaneous length: ε_{E} = ΔL/L. For a change over time, the Lagrangian strain will be: ε_{L} = Σ ΔL/L_{0}, and Eulerian Strain ε_{E} = Σ (ΔL/L). The term was first used by Mirsky and Parmley in describing regional differences in deformation between normal and ischemic myocardium

Strain rate is the rate of deformation. In ultrasound it is usually measured from the velocity gradient SR = (v_{2} - v_{1})/L where v_{2}and v_{1} are the myocardial velocities at two different points, and L is the instantaneous distance between them. This is thus equivalent to the velocity difference per length unit (the spatial derivative of velocity) and has the unit s^{−1}. Strain is then integrated from strain rate. This method, however, yields the Eulerian strain rate and strain. It has become traditional to use the Velocity gradient, but in integrating strain rate it is converted to Lagrangian strain by the formula ε_{L} = e^{ε_{E}} - 1.

Strain in three dimensions: Basically, any object or body is three dimensional, and can be deformed in different directions simultaneously. Strain can be described as a tensor with three principal strains (ε_{x}, ε_{y} and ε_{z} in a Cartesian coordinate system), and six shear strains components. In the heart, it has been customary to describe the three principal strain components as longitudinal (in the direction of the long axis of the ventricles), circumferential (in the direction of the ventricular circumference), and transmural (the deformation across the wall. Transmural deformation has also been called "radial", but this is unfortunate as in ultrasound in general the term radial describes "in the direction of the ultrasound beam"). However, as the heart muscle is incompressible, the three principal strain must balance; ((ε_{x}+1)(ε_{y}+1)(ε_{z}+1) = 1). As the ventricle contracts in systole, there is longitudinal shortening (negative strain), circumferential shortening (negative strain) and transmural (wall) thickening (positive strain). Due to this, and the fact that the left ventricle in normal conditions contract with a relatively invariant outer contour, the longitudinal strain contains the main information, while transmural strain (wall thickening) is a function of wall shortening, wall thickness and chamber diameter, while circumferential shortening is mainly a function of wall thickening. It has been shown clinically that longitudinal strain rate and wall thickening are diagnostically equivalent.

== Methods ==
Strain rate imaging can be done by two principally different methods.

=== Tissue Doppler ===
The Tissue Doppler method is based on the colour Doppler, giving a velocity field with velocity vectors along the ultrasound beam over the whole sector. It measures the velocity gradient between two points along the ultrasound beam with a set distance. It gives the same result as the velocity gradient. This method has been validated experimentally in a mechanical model, in an animal model, and in patients against echocardiography, coronary angiography and MR The method is limited to one direction; along the ultrasound beam, can thus mainly be used from the apical window, and for longitudinal strain and strain rate measurements only. It is sensitive to angle deviation between the velocity vector (direction of motion) and the ultrasound beam, and is sensitive to noise, especially clutter noise. It has a high temporal resolution, at the cost of a relatively low lateral spatial resolution.

=== Speckle tracking ===
Speckle tracking echocardiography is based on grey scale echocardiography (B-mode), and the fact that the reflected echo from the myocardium shows a speckle pattern that is a mixture of small scatters and interference patterns. The pattern being random, each region of the myocardium (called a "kernel"), has a unique speckle pattern, and that this speckle pattern is relatively stable, at least from one frame to next. By this, the movement of a kernel from one frame to the next, can be tracked by a "best match" search algorithm. The most commonly used is the "sum of absolute differences", shown to be similarly accurate as Cross-correlation. The method thus tracks a kernels motion from one frame to the next. From the frame rate, the velocity vector can be calculated, both in magnitude and direction. From this, a velocity field again can be generated over the whole sector, as with tissue Doppler, and strain rate can be derived, and then strain can be integrated. Alternatively strain can be measured directly from the change in distance between speckles. (resulting in Lagrangian strain directly), and strain rate derived temporally (it then has to be converted to Eulerian strain rate). The speckle tracking methods varies with non-commercial and commercial systems. Speckle tracking has been shown to be comparable to tissue Doppler derived strain, and has been validated against MR

The method tracks independently of the beam directions, and can thus track in two dimensions. It is also said to be independent of the angle error inherent in the Doppler algorithm. However, as the radial resolution (along the beam) is far better than the lateral resolution which also decreases with depth, both the angle independence and the tracking ability across the sector is lower. Also, instead of angle independency, the resulting strain values are dependent on the ROI (Region Of Interest) size and shape. Finally, in order to achieve tracking quality, the values are in most commercial applications smoothed by a spline smoothing function along the ROI, so the regional measurements are not pure regional, but rather to a degree, spline functions of the global average. In addition, the method has a lower sampling rate due to the limited frame rate of B-mode, which reduces tracking validity, especially at high heart rates.

Colour-coded left atrial strain assessed by speckle tracking during a representative cardiac cycle.

Systemic sclerosis (SSc) patient: 2D longitudinal strain of the right ventricle. The values of the basal, mid and apical segment of the free lateral wall were taken for further analysis.

== Display ==
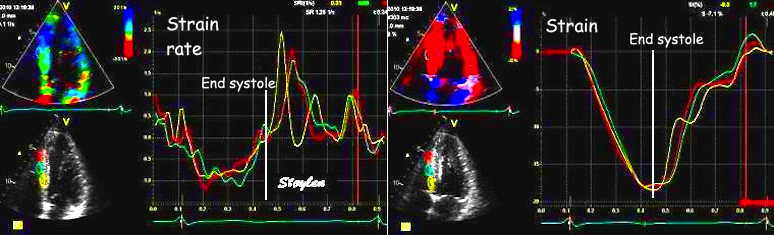
Longitudinal strain rate and strain: multiple simultaneous traces from three different regions in the septum. Left: strain rate, Right: Strain. As thelongitudinal systolic deformation is shortening, the systolic strain and strain rate is negative. The strain curves shows the gradual decrease in length during systole, and then the gradual lengthening during diastole, but strain rate fremans negative during the whole heart cycle, as the ventricular length is shorter than at end systole. Strain rate is the rate of deformation, and is negative during systole, when the ventricle shortens. Strain rate, however, becomes positive when the ventricle lengthens. Thus the more rapid phase shifts show details of the lengthening, displaying that it is not homogeneous.

Strain rate colour curved anatomical M-mode. The yellow line is drawn from the base of the septum, through the apex and down the lateral wall as can be seen on the small images on the left. The rectangular area then represents the colour M-mode, where the vertical axis is distance along the line, while the horizontal axis is time. The image represents one heart cycle. Strain rate values are yellow to red for negative strain rate (shortening) and cyan to blue for positive strain rate (lengthening). Green represents area and time of no deformation.

Both methods measures the same physiological phenomena (deformation), and results can in principle be displayed the same way.

=== Curves ===
The most common way is by displaying curves of the strain and strain rate, typically the time course during one heart cycle. Each curve will then represent the deformation in one region of the myocardium, but acquisition of a full sector allows display of multiple curves simultaneously in the same image for comparison.

=== Colour display ===
Strain and strain rate values can be reduced to colour coded images, where strain or strain rate are shown as colours in semi-quantitative parametric imaging. This makes the method more robust, but numerical values are not available. On the other hand, this may result in a better spatial resolution. The displays most commonly used, are Bull's eye (reconstructed from multiple apical planes), which displays all parts of the left ventricle simultaneously, but only at one point in time. This is useful for either mid systolic strain rate or end systolic strain. Inhomogeneous strain rate or strain, representing regions with reduced contractility are often very evident visually.

Curved anatomical M-mode from either one wall, or both walls simultaneously, gives a space-time diagram of the deformation, showing both spatial or temporal inhomogeneities in deformation. It is most useful when applied to strain rate, due to the rapid shifts in phase visible as seen by the figure. The strain rate values are reduced to semi quantitative visual display, but this mode allows measurement of timing, as well as depth, and is best suited to space-time relation measurement

== Clinical use ==
It is a major point that strain rate imaging is just a part of an integrated echocardiographic examination. Like all other measures, deformation measurements have limited accuracy, and should be considered together with the rest of findings. Also, a knowledge of the pitfalls and artefacts of the specific methods, is an advantage. However, the methods offer unique ways of imaging regional dysfunction, that may strengthen the conclusion.

=== Regional function ===
Normal values for strain and strain rate has been established by the HUNT study.

==== Myocardial infarction ====
In myocardial infarction, a limited region of the heart muscle has reduced or totally absent function. It has been shown to be at least as accurate as B-mode echocardiography. Deformation imaging has also been shown to be useful in following recovery of an infarcted myocardial area, to ascertain the amount of Myocardial stunning vs. necrosis.

==== Myocardial ischemia ====
In stress echocardiography (see Cardiac stress test), the regional dysfunction due to ischemia will become evident when the myocardial oxygen demand surpasses the Coronary flow reserve of a stenosed coronary artery. Strain rate imaging during stress has been shown to give incremental value over ordinary echocardiography, both diagnostic and prognostic. In stress echo, the increased heart rate has speckle tracking at a disadvantage, due to the limited frame rate that affects tracking at higher heart rates.

==== Ventricular dyssynchrony ====
In Left bundle branch block (LBBB), the asynchronous activation of the left ventricle gives asynchronous contraction as well. This asynchrony can be visualised by ordinary echocardiography. It can also be demonstrated by tissue velocities, but strain rate imaging will in addition demonstrate the distribution of the asynchrony, and the demonstration of the amount of inefficient work done by the asynchronous ventricle. Disappointingly, large scale studies have not been able to establish additional echo criteria for selection of Heart failure patients with LBBB who may respond to Cardiac resynchronization therapy, although smaller studies are promising

=== Global function ===
In later years, Global strain by speckle tracking has achieved popularity as the global functional measure. It has an advantage over Ejection fraction (EF), it shows reduced cardiac function also in hypertrophic hearts with small ventricles and normal ejection fraction (HFNEF), which is often seen in Hypertensive heart disease, Hypertrophic cardiomyopathy and Aortic stenosis. The EF is not a pure functional measure, as it is also dependent on wall thickness It has also been shown to be more sensitive than EF. However, the incremental diagnostic and prognostic value of measuring LV shortening was already shown for the absolute measure

Global strain is basically LV shortening/LV end diastolic length, which means that this is a normalisation of LV shortening for LV heart size. It remains to be proven that this actually confers additional information.
