= Speckle tracking echocardiography =

- Postoperative circumferential LV strain rate 2-D speckle tracking
- Purpose: analyzes the motion of tissues in the heart

In the fields of cardiology and medical imaging, speckle tracking echocardiography (STE) is an echocardiographic imaging technique. It analyzes the motion of tissues in the heart by using the naturally occurring speckle pattern in the myocardium (or motion of blood when imaged by ultrasound).

This method of documentation of myocardial motion is a noninvasive method of definition for both vectors and velocity. When compared to other technologies seeking noninvasive definition of ischemia, speckle tracking seems a valuable endeavor. The speckle pattern is a mixture of interference patterns and natural acoustic reflections. These reflections are also described as speckles or markers.

The pattern being random, each region of the myocardium has a unique speckle pattern (also called patterns, features, or fingerprints) that allows the region to be tracked. The speckle pattern is relatively stable, at least from one frame to the next. In post processing this can be tracked consecutively frame to frame and ultimately resolved into angle-independent two-dimensional (2D) and three-dimensional strain-based sequences (3D). These sequences provide both quantitative and qualitative information regarding tissue deformation and motion.

== Basic principles ==
As the speckle pattern is random, any region of the myocardium has a unique speckle pattern: Within the picture, a defined area "kernel" can be defined, and as this speckle pattern is relatively stable, the kernel can be recognised in the next frame, within a larger search area, by a "best match" search algorithm. There are different search algorithms, the most commonly used is "sum of absolute differences", shown to be similarly accurate as cross-correlation, which is an alternative. The movement of the kernel across the image can thus be tracked, in principle independent of the beam angle, as opposed to tissue Doppler. Speckle tracking can thus track in two dimensions. However, as the axial (in the direction of the beam) resolution of the ultrasound is far better than the transverse, the tracking ability is less in the transverse direction. Also, the transverse resolution (and hence, tracking ability) decreases with depth, in a sector scan where ultrasound beams diverge.

Different commercial and non commercial operators then use different approaches to derive motion and deformation parameters. The motion of a single kernel can be resolved into displacement curves, and the distance between two kernels into strain (deformation). Strain rate will then be time derivative of strain. In some commercial applications, the acoustic markers are tracked more individually, calculating the velocity from the motion and the sampling interval (inverse of frame rate) generating a velocity field. Unlike tissue Doppler, this velocity field in not limited to the beam direction. Strain rate and strain are then calculated from the velocities. Speckle tracking has been shown to be comparable to tissue Doppler derived strain, and has been validated against MR.

== Strain ==
Strain is defined as the fractional or percentage change in an objects dimension in comparison to the object’s original dimension. Similarly, strain rate can be defined as the speed at which deformation occurs. Mathematically, three components of normal strain (εx, εy, and εz) and three components of shear strain (εxy, εxz, and εyz) are recognized. Congruently, when applied to the left ventricle, left ventricular deformation is defined by the three normal strains (longitudinal, circumferential, and radial) and three shear strains (circumferential-longitudinal, circumferential-radial, and longitudinal-radial). The principal benefit of LV shear strains is amplification of the 15% shortening of myocytes into 40% radial LV wall thickening, which ultimately translates into a >60% change in LV ejection fraction. Left ventricular shearing increases towards the subendocardium, resulting in a subepicardial to subendocardial thickening strain gradient. Similar to MRI, STE utilizes "Lagrangian strain" which defines motion around a particular point in tissue as it revolves through time and space. Throughout the cardiac cycle, the end-diastolic tissue dimension represents the unstressed initial material length. Speckle tracking is one of two methods for Strain rate imaging, the other being Tissue Doppler.

Twist or torsional deformation define the base-to-apex gradient and is the result of myocardial shearing in the circumferential-longitudinal planes such that, when viewed from the apex, the base rotates in a counterclockwise direction. Likewise the LV apex concomitantly rotates in a clockwise direction. During ejection, LV torsion results in the storage of potential energy into the deformed myofibers. This stored energy is released with the onset of relaxation similar to a spring uncoiling and results in suction forces. These forces are then used for rapid early diastolic restoration.

== Applications and limitations ==
The utilities of STE are increasingly recognized. Strain results derived from STE have been validated using sonomicrometry and tagged MRI and results correlate significantly with Tissue Doppler–derived measurements. Tissue Doppler technology, the alternative method for strain rate imaging to speckle tracking technology, requires achieving sufficient parallel orientation between the direction of motion and the ultrasound beam. Its use has remained limited due to angle dependency, substantial intraobserver and interobserver variability and noise interference. Speckle tracking technology has to a certain degree overcome these limitations.

In order to achieve sufficient tracking quality when single markers are used, however commercial algorithms very often resort to varieties of spline smoothing using available information from the strongest echoes, very oft the mitral annulus, so the regional measurements are not pure regional, but rather to a degree, spline functions of the global average. AS the method uses B-mode, frame rate of speckle tracking is limited to the relatively low frame rate of B-mode. If the frame rate is too low, the tracking quality becomes reduced, due to frame-to-frame decorrelation. This may also be a problem if the heart rate is high, (which in fact is a relative decrease in frame rate - fewer frames per heart cycle).

Increasing frame rate in B-mode is done by reducing line density, i.e. lateral resolution, and thus making the method more angle dependent. Finally, the method on some applications is dependent on the ROI (Region Of Interest) size and shape. In principle Speckle tracking is available for deformation measurement in all directions, however, due to the limitation of lateral resolution in apical images, measuring circumferential and transmural deformation needs parasternal cross sectional views. On the other hand, compared to Tissue Doppler, that method is mainly only available for longitudinal measures from the apical position.

In the study by Cho et al, both TVI derived and speckle tracking derived longitudinal strain showed modest correlation with MRI derived strain. The ROC analysis showed significantly higher AUC for speckle tracking for detecting dysfunctional segments. However, this study only included patients with coronary disease. The lower frame rate has been seen to be a problem in stress echo, as the peak stress shows a fairly high frame rate.

The main problem with speckle tracking, however, is increasingly recognised: The lack of standardisation. Each vendor of ultrasound equipment, or analysis software, has different algorithms, that will perform differently during analysis. In head to head comparisons, biases between analysis may be substantial, especially when compared to an external reference. Thus, measurements, normal limits and cut off values are only vendor specific. Due to industrial secrecy, the details of the different algorithms may also be largely unavailable, so a detailed investigation in modelling is difficult.

Clinical Applications of Speckle Tracking Technology:

- Coronary Artery Disease
- Myocardial Infarctions
- Stress Echocardiography
- Revascularization
- Valvular Disease
- Left Ventricular Hypertrophy
- Hypertensive Heart Disease
- Hypertrophic Cardiomyopathy
- Dilated Cardiomyopathy
- Stress Cardiomyopathy
- Pericardial Disease/Restrictive Cardiomyopathy
- Diastolic Heart Disease
- Left Ventricular dyssynchrony
- Congenital Heart Disease
- Drug-Induced Cardiotoxicity

== See also ==
- Echocardiography terminology
- Strain rate imaging
