= Diastasis (physiology) =

Middle stage of diastole during the cycle of a heartbeat

Wiggers diagram of the cardiac cycle, with diastasis marked at top.

In physiology, diastasis is the middle stage of diastole during the cycle of a heartbeat, where the initial passive filling of the heart's ventricles has slowed, but before the atria contract to complete the active filling. Diastasis is the longest phase of cardiac cycle.

== See also ==
- Compare diastasis (pathology)
