= Echocardiography =

Medical imaging technique of the heart

- Three-dimensional echocardiogram of a heart viewed from the apex
- ICD-9-CM: 88.72
- MeSH: D004452
- OPS-301 code: 3-052
- MedlinePlus: 003869

Echocardiography, also known as cardiac ultrasound, is the use of ultrasound to examine the heart. It is a type of medical imaging, using standard ultrasound or Doppler ultrasound. The visual image formed using this technique is called an echocardiogram, a cardiac echo, or simply an echo.

Echocardiography is routinely used in the diagnosis, management, and follow-up of patients with any suspected or known heart diseases. It is one of the most widely used diagnostic imaging modalities in cardiology. It can provide a wealth of helpful information, including the size and shape of the heart (internal chamber size quantification), pumping capacity, location and extent of any tissue damage, and assessment of valves. An echocardiogram can also give physicians other estimates of heart function, such as a calculation of the cardiac output, ejection fraction, and diastolic function (how well the heart relaxes).

Echocardiography is an important tool in assessing wall motion abnormality in patients with suspected cardiac disease. It is a tool which helps in reaching an early diagnosis of myocardial infarction, showing regional wall motion abnormality. Also, it is important in treatment and follow-up in patients with heart failure, by assessing ejection fraction.

Echocardiography can help detect cardiomyopathies, such as hypertrophic cardiomyopathy, and dilated cardiomyopathy. The use of stress echocardiography may also help determine whether any chest pain or associated symptoms are related to heart disease.

The most important advantages of echocardiography are that it is not invasive (does not involve breaking the skin or entering body cavities) and has no known risks or side effects.

Not only can an echocardiogram create ultrasound images of heart structures, but it can also produce accurate assessment of the blood flowing through the heart by Doppler echocardiography, using pulsed- or continuous-wave Doppler ultrasound. This allows assessment of both normal and abnormal blood flow through the heart. Color Doppler, as well as spectral Doppler, is used to visualize any abnormal communications between the left and right sides of the heart, as well as any leaking of blood through the valves (valvular regurgitation), and can also estimate how well the valves open (or do not open in the case of valvular stenosis). The Doppler technique can also be used for tissue motion and velocity measurement, by tissue Doppler echocardiography.

Echocardiography was also the first ultrasound subspecialty to use intravenous contrast. Echocardiography is performed by cardiac sonographers, cardiac physiologists (UK), or physicians trained in echocardiography.

The Swedish physician Inge Edler (1911–2001), a graduate of Lund University, is recognized as the "Father of Echocardiography". He was the first in his profession to apply ultrasonic pulse echo imaging, which the acoustical physicist Floyd Firestone had developed to detect defects in metal castings, in diagnosing cardiac disease. Edler in 1953 produced the first echocardiographs using an industrial Firestone-Sperry Ultrasonic Reflectoscope. In developing echocardiography, Edler worked with the physicist Carl Hellmuth Hertz, the son of the Nobel laureate Gustav Hertz and grandnephew of Heinrich Rudolph Hertz.

== Medical uses ==
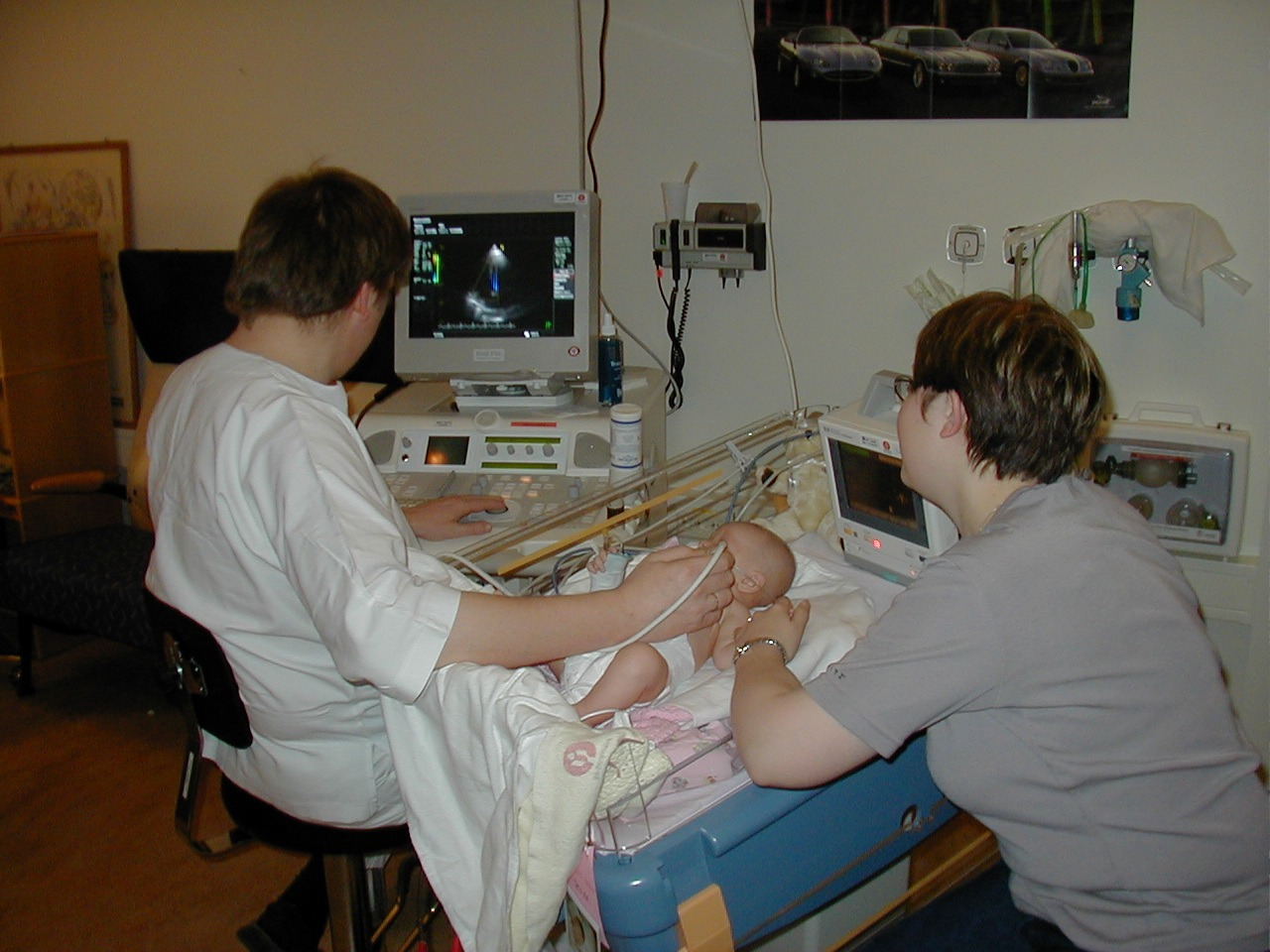
Sonographer doing an echocardiogram of a child

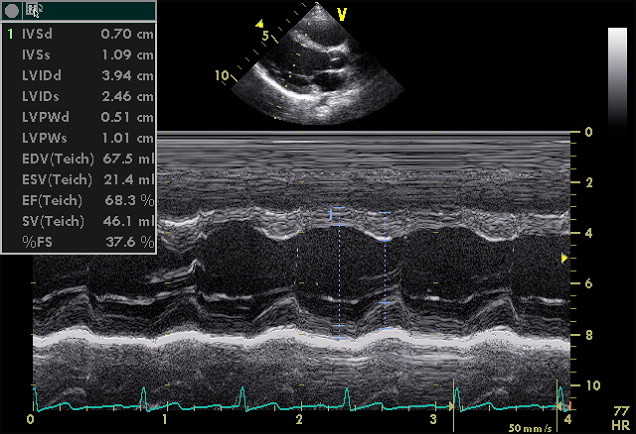
Echocardiogram in the parasternal long-axis view, showing a measurement of the heart's left ventricle

Health societies recommend the use of echocardiography for initial diagnosis when a change in the person's clinical status occurs and when new data from an echocardiogram would result in the physician changing the person's care. Diagnostic criteria for numerous cardiac diseases are based on echocardiography studies. For example, the differentiation of mild, moderate, and severe valvular disease is based upon measured criteria. Another example is the estimation of heart function by the left ventricular ejection fraction (LVEF) has vast uses including classification of heart failure and cut offs for implantation of implantable cardioverter-defibrillators.

Health societies do not recommend routine testing when the patient has no change in clinical status or when a physician is unlikely to change care for the patient based on the results of testing. A common example of overuse of echocardiography when not indicated is the use of routine testing in response to a patient diagnosis of mild valvular heart disease. In this case, patients are often asymptomatic for years before the onset of deterioration and the results of the echocardiogram would not result in a change in care without other change in clinical status.

Echocardiography has a vast role in pediatrics, diagnosing patients with valvular heart disease and other congenital abnormalities. An emerging branch is fetal echocardiography, which involves echocardiography of an unborn fetus.

== Types ==
=== Transthoracic echocardiogram ===
A standard echocardiogram is also known as a transthoracic echocardiogram (TTE) or cardiac ultrasound, and it is used for rapid evaluation of a patient at their bedside. In this case, ultrasound gel is applied to the chest wall to help transmit the ultrasound waves, then the echocardiography transducer (or probe) is placed on the chest wall (or thorax) of the subject, and images are taken through the chest wall. This is a non-invasive, highly accurate, and quick assessment of the overall function of the heart. Transthoracic echocardiography can display structure of heart chambers, myocardial motion, and valvular function in real time, and is widely used to access a variety of cardiovascular diseases, such as ventricular systolic dysfunction, valvular heart disease, and pericardial disease. But, although TTE is a non-invasive and widely used examination method, its image quality can be influenced by body fat, thickness of chest, and other factors.

TTE utilizes several "windows" to image the heart from different perspectives. Each window has advantages and disadvantages for viewing specific structures within the heart and, typically, numerous windows are utilized within the same study to fully assess the heart. Parasternal long and parasternal short axis windows are taken next to the sternum, the apical two/three/four chamber windows are taken from the apex of the heart (lower left side), and the subcostal window is taken from underneath the edge of the last rib.

TTE utilizes M-mode, 2D and 3D ultrasounds (time is implicit and not included) from the different windows. These can be combined with pulse wave or continuous wave Doppler to visualize the velocity of blood flow through the left ventricle and structure movements. Images can be enhanced with "contrast" that are typically some sort of micro bubble suspension that reflect the ultrasound waves.

=== Transesophageal echocardiogram ===
A transesophageal echocardiogram is an alternative way to perform an echocardiogram. A specialized probe containing an ultrasound transducer at its tip is passed into the patient's esophagus via the mouth, allowing image and Doppler evaluation from a location directly behind the heart. It is most often used when transthoracic images are suboptimal and when a clearer and more precise image is needed for assessment or in specific conditions such as being in a critical condition, such as having low oxygen levels or needing heart surgery. Because the esophagus is located behind and close to the heart, this method can provide higher resolution images than Transthoracic echocardiography (TTE).

This test is performed in the presence of a cardiologist, anesthesiologist, registered nurse, and ultrasound technologist. During the examination, patients need to be fasting. Before the examination begins, the doctor will administer local anesthesia to patient's throat and administer sedative drugs if necessary.

TEE is invasive. During the examination, a flexible scope with an ultrasound probe will be slowly inserted into the esophagus, the position and angle of the probe can be adjusted as needed to obtain different angle of view. Additionally, modern multiplane TEE probes use transducer elements to generate a two-dimension plane, and the ultrasound plane can be rotated electronically to permit an additional dimension to optimize views of the heart structures. Often, movement in all of these dimensions is needed.

TEE can be used as stand-alone procedures, or incorporated into catheter- or surgical-based procedures. For example, during a valve replacement surgery the TEE can be used to assess the valve function immediately before repair/replacement and immediately after. This permits revising the valve mid-surgery, if needed, to improve outcomes of the surgery.

=== Stress echocardiography ===
A stress echocardiogram, also known as a stress echo, uses ultrasound imaging of the heart to assess the wall motion in response to physical stress. First, images of the heart are taken "at rest" to acquire a baseline of the patient's wall motion at a resting heart rate. The patient then walks on a treadmill or uses another exercise modality to increase the heart rate to his or her target heart rate, or 85% of the age-predicted maximum heart rate (220 − patient's age). Finally, images of the heart are taken "at stress" to assess wall motion at the peak heart rate. A stress echo assesses wall motion of the heart; it does not, however, create an image of the coronary arteries directly. Ischemia of one or more coronary arteries could cause a wall motion abnormality, which could indicate coronary artery disease. The gold standard test to directly create an image of the coronary arteries and directly assess for stenosis or occlusion is a cardiac catheterization. A stress echo is not invasive and is performed in the presence of a licensed medical professional, such as a cardiologist, and a cardiac sonographer.

A systematic review and meta-analysis published in Heart in 2024 studied the long-term capabilities of stress echocardiography being used to identify coronary artery disease. Data were collected from over 16,000 patients from a total of six clinical trials. The results from the meta-analysis show that patients with a positive stress echocardiography test (indicative of reduced blood flow to the heart from coronary arteries) had higher annual rates of major adverse cardiovascular events (MACE) and all-cause mortality than those with negative results. The annual MACE rate was 1.99% for patients with a positive test compared to 1.54% in those with negative tests. The mortality rates for the patients were 1.68% and 1.02% respectively. The results from the meta-analysis show that stress echocardiography may be able to provide predictive long-term information and can be used for better risk assessment in patients with coronary artery disease.

=== Intracardiac echocardiography ===
Intracardiac echocardiography (ICE) is specialized form of echocardiography that uses catheters to insert the ultrasound probe inside the heart to view structures from within the heart. ICE is often used as a part of the cardiac procedure of crossing the interatrial septum with a transseptal puncture to permit catheter access from the right atrium to the left atrium; alternative access to the left heart would be retrograde through the aorta and across the aortic valve into the left ventricle.

ICE has the benefit over transthoracic echocardiography in that an operator who is performing a sterile procedure can also operate the ICE catheter and it is not limited to visibility problems that can arise with transthoracic or transesophageal echo. Though, there are image quality limitations due to size constraints of the probe being limited to a catheter.

ICE is often inserted through the femoral vein and into the right atrium. From the right atrium, visualization of the interatrial septum, all four cardiac chambers, all four valves, and the pericardial space (for an effusion) can be readily visualized. It can also be advanced across the atrial septum into the left atrium to visualize the left atrial appendage during left atrial appendage occlusion device deployment.

According to Singleton & Osorio, electrophysiologic studies and catheter ablation have been done using fluoroscopic guidance but have recently transitioned to using electroanatomic mapping (EAM) and ICE to stop using fluoroscopy. EAM and ICE allow for three-dimensional accurate images of the chamber being imaged, guidewires, and catheter-tissue interfaces. This combination has replaced fluoroscopy for electrophysiologic procedures.

=== Intravascular ultrasound ===
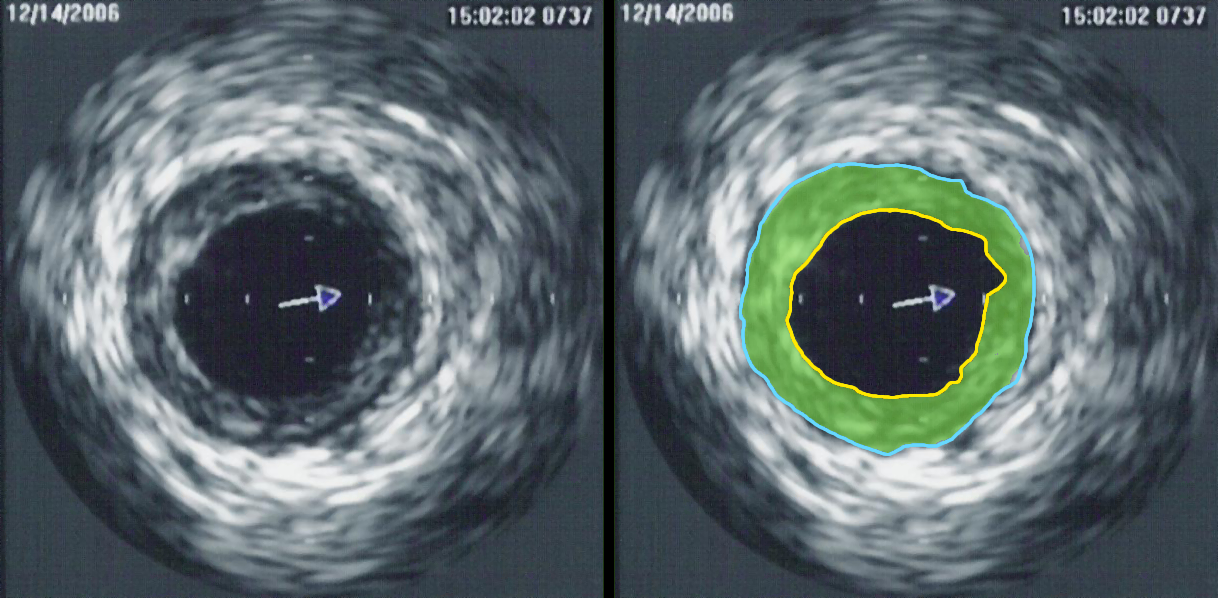
Coronary artery IVUS with lumen inside yellow line and atherosclerotic plaque in green

Intravascular ultrasound (IVUS) is an intravascular technique that uses a catheter to insert the ultrasound probe inside blood vessels. This is commonly used to measure the size of blood vessels and to measure the internal diameter of the blood vessel. For example, this can be used in a coronary angiogram to assess the narrowing of the coronary artery.

IVUS images the inside of blood vessels, so it allowed direct observation of the inside of vessels. During the examination, a catheter with ultrasound probe is inserted into a blood vessel through the femoral or radial artery. Then the probe can be pushed to the target vessel location, such as coronary artery. When probe reached, it emits ultrasound waves and received reflected echoes. As the catheter is retraced in a controlled manner, then an internal map can be generated to see the contour of the vessel and its branches.

== Modes ==
The various modes describe how the ultrasound crystals are used to obtain information. These modes are common to all types of echocardiography.

=== A-mode ===
A-scan or one-dimensional ultrasound represents over half the standard ECHO exam. The A stands for amplitude which means the echocardiogram is the processed amplitude versus time produced as an output from the receiver of ultrasound. For example, it is how aortic stenosis valve area (or any obstruction). It is also how pressures are calculated in the heart such as right ventricle systolic pressure (RVSP). It is usually used in the form of Doppler measurements. There are two forms, pulse and continuous. Pulsed allows velocities to be calculated in a specific place but has a limited velocity range can be used. Continuous wave allows the velocity to be measured from zero to the fastest blood velocities a diseased heart can generate. However, it cannot tell you where in the A-scan the high velocity is coming from. Continuous wave would be used to calculate aortic stenosis because you know the high velocity is coming from the stenosis region. Pulsed would be used to find a ventricular septal defect where there should be no velocity across the septum and the pulsed tells you the location.

=== B-mode ===
B-mode is also known as brightness mode. It is based on the conversion of A-mode ultrasound signals into a two-dimensional grayscale image, where stronger signal appear brighter and weaker signals appear darker. Multiple signal lines swept across the heart can build a cross-sectional image of it in real time.

=== M-mode ===
M-Mode uses a single ultrasound line to obtain a one-dimensional view of all the structures that reflect the ultrasound wave. The ultrasounds in M-mode can capture the heart in systole and diastole. One disadvantage of M-mode is that it only uses one ultrasound line which is not able to move from the tip of the transducer.

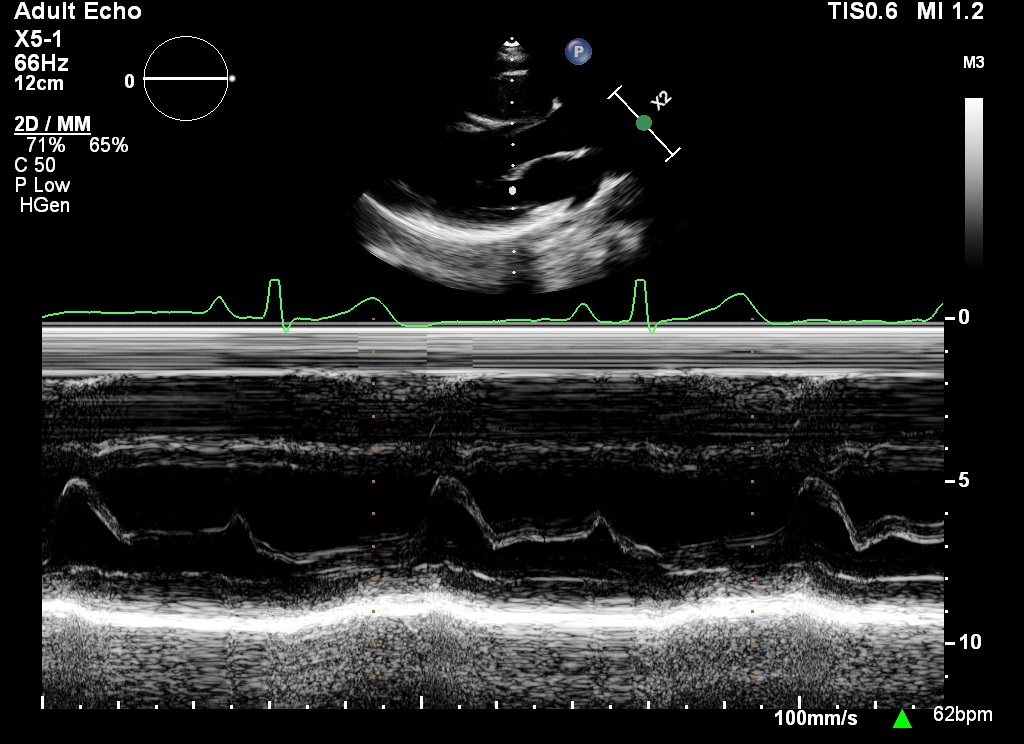
M-mode imaging being used to interrogate the mitral valve from the parasternal long axis view

=== Strain rate imaging (deformation echocardiography) ===
Strain rate imaging utilizing echocardiography is a method that can be used to detect abnormalities in the heart. Strain rate imaging measures either regional systolic deformation (strain) or the rate of regional deformation (strain rate). The methods used are either tissue Doppler or Speckle tracking echocardiography. According to Smiseth et al. (2024) one clinical application of strain rate imaging is using longitudinal strain instead of using ejection fraction for diagnosing mild systolic dysfunction.

=== Three-dimensional echocardiography ===
Three-dimensional echocardiography (also known as four-dimensional echocardiography when the picture is moving) is possible using a matrix array ultrasound probe and an appropriate processing system. It enables detailed anatomical assessment of cardiac pathology, particularly valvular defects, and cardiomyopathies. The ability to slice the virtual heart in infinite planes in an anatomically appropriate manner and to reconstruct three-dimensional images of anatomic structures make it unique for the understanding of the congenitally malformed heart. Real-time three-dimensional echocardiography can be used to guide the location of bioptomes during right ventricular endomyocardial biopsies, placement of catheter-delivered valvular devices, and in many other intraoperative assessments.

Three-dimensional echocardiography technology may feature anatomical intelligence, or the use of organ-modeling technology, to automatically identify anatomy based on generic models. All generic models refer to a dataset of anatomical information that uniquely adapts to variability in patient anatomy to perform specific tasks. Built on feature recognition and segmentation algorithms, this technology can provide patient-specific three-dimensional modeling of the heart and other aspects of the anatomy, including the brain, lungs, liver, kidneys, rib cage, and vertebral column.

=== Myocardial contrast echocardiography ===
Myocardial contrast echocardiography (MCE) is a technique that has been developed over the past three decades that uses microbubbles, also called ultrasound-enhancing agents (UEA), to improve cardiac imaging. UEA improves signal acquisition (increased backscatter) and amplifies the signal (non-linear behavior) which helps improve tissue contrast of the heart and detect abnormalities. The microbubbles are smaller than 10 μm so they do not disrupt any blood vessels. UEAs have shown to be safe and effective in identifying various cardiac diseases.

== Accreditation ==
Echocardiography can at many times be subjective, meaning that the person reading the echo may have personal input that affects the interpretation of the findings, leading to so-called "inter-observer variability", where different echocardiographers might produce different reports when examining the same images. It necessitated the development of accreditation programs around the world. The aim of such programs is to standardize the practice of echocardiography and to ensure that practitioners have the proper training prior to practicing echocardiography which will eventually limit inter-observer variability.

=== Europe ===
At the European level individual and laboratory accreditation is provided by the European Association of Echocardiography (EAE). There are three subspecialties for individual accreditation: Adult Transthoracic Echocardiography (TTE), Adult Transesophageal Echocardiography (TEE) and Congenital Heart Disease Echocardiography (CHD).

=== UK ===
In the UK, accreditation is regulated by the British Society of Echocardiography. Accredited radiographers, sonographers, or other professionals are required to pass a mandatory exam.

=== United States ===
The "Intersocietal Accreditation Commission for Echocardiography" (IAC) sets standards for echo labs across the US. Cardiologists and sonographers who wish to have their laboratory accredited by IAC must comply with these standards. The purpose of accreditation is to maintain quality and consistency across echocardiography labs in the United States. Accreditation is offered in adult and pediatric transthoracic and transesophageal echocardiography, as well as adult stress and fetal echo. Accreditation is a two-part process. Each facility will conduct a detailed self-evaluation, paying close attention to the IAC Standards and Guidelines. The facility will then complete the application and submit actual case studies to the board of directors for review. Once all requirements have been met, the lab will receive certification. IAC certification is a continual process and must be maintained by the facility: it may include audits or site visits by the IAC. There are several states in which Medicare and/or private insurance carriers require accreditation (credentials) of the laboratory and/or sonographer for reimbursement of echocardiograms.

There are two credentialing bodies in the United States for sonographers, the Cardiovascular Credentialing International'(CCI), established in 1968, and the American Registry for Diagnostic Medical Sonography (ARDMS), established in 1975. Both CCI and ARDMS have earned the prestigious ANSI-ISO 17024 accreditation for certifying bodies from the International Organization for Standardization (ISO). Accreditation is granted through the American National Standards Institute (ANSI). Recognition of ARDMS programs in providing credentials has also earned the ARDMS accreditation with the National Commission for Certifying Agencies (NCCA). The NCCA is the accrediting arm of the National Organization for Competency Assurance (NOCA).

Under both credentialing bodies, sonographers must first document completion of prerequisite requirements, which contain both didactic and hands-on experience in the field of ultrasound. Applicants must then take a comprehensive exam demonstrating knowledge in both the physics of ultrasound and the clinical competency related to their specialty. Credentialed sonographers are then required to maintain competency in their field by obtaining a certain number of Continuing Medical Education credits, or CME's.

In 2009, New Mexico and Oregon became the first two states to require licensure of sonographers.

The American Society of Echocardiography (ASE) is a professional organization made up of physicians, sonographers, nurses, and scientists involved in the field of echocardiography. One of the most important roles that the ASE plays is providing their recommendations through the ASE Guidelines and Standards, providing resource and educational opportunities for sonographers and physicians in the field.

Various institutes are working on use of artificial intelligence in echo, but they are at a very early stage and still need full development.

== Terminology ==
Commonly used terms in echocardiography diagnostics include:

- BSA – body surface area
- DT – deceleration time
- IVRT – isovolumic relaxation time
- LA – left atrium
- RA – right atrium
- LV – left ventricle
- RV – right ventricle
- LVOT – left ventricular outflow tract
- RVOT – right ventricular outflow tract
- PHT – pressure half time
- TAPSE – tricuspid annular plane systolic excursion
- VC – vena contracta
- EDD – end diastolic diameter
- ESD – end systolic diameter
- IVSd – interventricular septal end diastole
- PWd – posterior wall thickness
- LVMI – left ventricular mass index
- Ao asc – ascending aorta
- ST Jxn – sinotubular junction
- LAVI – left atrial volume index
- EDV – end-diastolic volume
- ESV – end-systolic volume
- EF – ejection fraction
- FS – fractional shortening
- RAVI – right atrial volume index
- RVOT – right ventricular outflow tract
- RVD – basal RV diameter
- IVC – inferior vena cava
- GLS – global longitudinal strain
- RVSP – right ventricular systolic pressure
- E/A ratio

== See also ==
- Angiogram
- Aortic valve area calculation
- Electrocardiogram
- Fetal echocardiography
