= Ventricular dyssynchrony =

In cardiology, ventricular dyssynchrony is a difference in the timing, or lack of synchrony, of contractions in different ventricles in the heart. Large differences in timing of contractions can reduce cardiac efficiency and is correlated with heart failure.

== Types of dyssynchrony ==
Three chief presentations of dyssynchrony can occur:

Atrioventricular (AV) dyssynchrony occurs when there is an unfavorable difference in timing between atrial and ventricular contractions.

Interventricular dyssynchrony occurs when there is a difference in timing between right ventricular (RV) and left ventricular (LV) Systole.

Intraventricular dyssynchrony occurs when the timing in a sequence of activations and contractions of segments of the LV wall becomes abnormal. In all three types, changes in timing lead to changes in the dynamic behavior of the myocardial tissues, leading to mechanical dyssynchrony. All three presentations allow distinct and easily reproducible electrical signatures as illustrated by left and right bundle branch blocks, hemiblocks, etc. The concise measurement of the time and morphology of the QRS interval allows the interventional ability to manipulate this interval with biventricular pacemakers. It is important to distinguish ventricular dyssynchrony from ventricular dyssynergy. Dyssynergy refers to changes in relative strength of contractions, whereas dyssynchrony is a change in relative timing of contractions. Once again the terms inotropy and chronotropy apply to the pathology under examination. Biventricular pacing strongly favors chronotropy over inotropy.

== Diagnosis ==
Echocardiography and tissue Doppler echocardiography are both needed to fully diagnose the different types of ventricular dyssynchrony.

== Treatment ==
Recent studies suggest that cardiac resynchronization therapy can reduce the incidence of ventricular dyssynchrony and thus increase cardiac efficiency.

== See also ==
- Bundle branch block
- Ejection fraction
- Pacemaker syndrome
- Speckle tracking echocardiography
- Transthoracic echocardiogram
