= E/A ratio =

Measurement of heart function

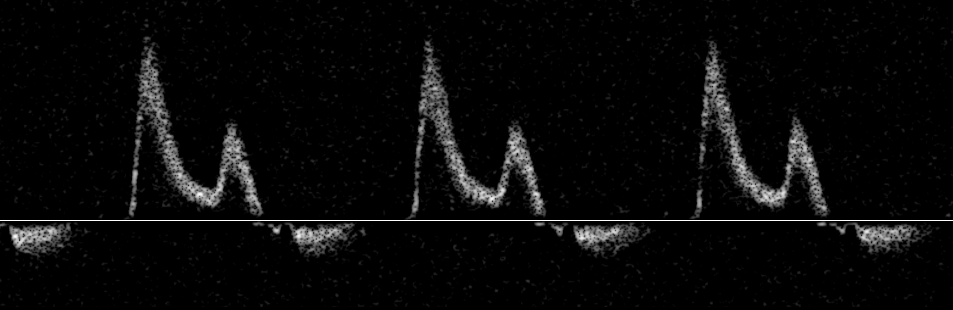
EAratio

The E/A ratio is a marker of the function of the left ventricle of the heart. It represents the ratio of peak velocity blood flow from left ventricular relaxation in early diastole (the E wave) to peak velocity flow in late diastole caused by atrial contraction (the A wave). It is calculated using Doppler echocardiography, an ultrasound-based cardiac imaging modality. Abnormalities in the E/A ratio suggest that the left ventricle, which pumps blood into the systemic circulation, cannot fill with blood properly in the period between contractions. This phenomenon is referred to as diastolic dysfunction and can eventually lead to the symptoms of heart failure.

== Physiology ==
The heart is a biological pump designed to move blood through the brain and body. It has four chambers: two "upper" chambers called the atria, and two "lower" chambers called the ventricles. Anatomically, the atria are more posterior to the ventricles, but for ease of understanding, are often drawn "above" them. The atria are separated from the ventricles beneath by the atrioventricular valves, which open to allow blood into the ventricles and close when ventricular pressure exceeds atrial pressure.

Blood is transferred into the ventricles in two steps: in the first step, as the ventricle relaxes from the previous systolic phase, the pressure in the ventricle becomes less than the pressure in the atria. This causes the leaflets of the atrioventricular valves (tricuspid on the right, mitral on the left) to open like trap doors, and blood falls into the ventricles. On the left side, the velocity at which the blood moves during this initial action is called the "E" ( for early) filling velocity. Early filling is responsible for roughly 80% of total ventricular filling. Some blood always remains in the atria, so toward the end of ventricular relaxation (diastole), the atria actively contract to empty the rest, causing the ventricle walls to "stretch", which allows for a stronger contraction during the upcoming systolic phase. This is called the "atrial kick". The velocity of the blood filling the ventricle in this step is the "A" (for atrial) filling.

Phases of diastole:

1. Isovolumic relaxation time (abbreviated as IVR)
2. early filling
3. diastasis
4. atrial contraction

== Influences ==
The E/A ratio is the ratio of the early (E) to late (A) ventricular filling velocities. In a healthy heart, the E velocity is greater than the A velocity. In certain conditions, especially ventricular hypertrophy, and with aging, the left ventricular wall can become stiff, increasing the back pressure as it fills, which slows the early (E) filling velocity, thus lowering the E/A ratio.

The reversal of the E/A ratio ('A' velocity becomes greater than 'E' velocity) is often accepted as a clinical marker of diastolic dysfunction, in which the left ventricular wall becomes so stiff as to impair proper filling, which can lead to diastolic heart failure. This can occur, for instance, with longstanding untreated hypertension.

The late phase is dependent upon atrial contraction and is therefore absent in patients with atrial fibrillation due to the lack of forceful atrial contraction, making the E/A ratio very large.

The E/A ratio is a first generation test for diastolic performance of the heart.

There are a number of factors that influence ventricular filling during each of these phases, but the main factor is the driving gradient between the atrial and ventricular pressure.

The E/A ratio is measured by placing a pulsed wave Doppler across the mitral valve and measuring the velocities across the valve. Hence, there are other names for the test, such as transmitral velocity profile, transmitral flow profile, transmitral flow velocity profile or transmitral Doppler waveforms.

Pulsed wave Doppler allows measurement of velocities at a specific point but has the disadvantage of aliasing, so it often has to be adjusted (baseline shifted) to best fit the individual point of measurement.

Isovolumic relaxation time (abbreviated as IVRT) is measured as the time between the closure of the aortic valve and the opening of the mitral valve.

The normal transmitral flow profile has two peaks – an E and an A wave.

The E peak arises due to early diastolic filling. Most filling (70-85%) of the ventricle occurs during this phase. The A peak arises due to atrial contraction, forcing approximately 15-20% of stroke volume into the ventricle. The deceleration time is the time taken from the maximum E point to baseline. In adults, it is normally less than 220 milliseconds.

== Interpretation ==
From this, a number of grades of diastolic function can be determined:

1. Normal diastolic function (E > A)
2. Impaired relaxation (E:A reversal i.e., E is < A)
3. Pseudonormal (E:A ratio appears normal)
4. Restrictive filling (E:A ratio often > 2)

Pseudonormalisation shows a transmitral profile that appears normal. However, with the use of pulmonary vein pulsed wave Doppler, it can be shown that the relaxation pattern is abnormal (systolic blunting, a decrease in the height of the S wave). In addition, performance of a Valsalva manoeuvre will result in unmasking of the pseudonormal state.

== Disadvantages ==
- Cursor position is important - if the PW sample window is incorrect, it produces artifact. The cursor should be placed at the level of the open leaflets in diastole.
- Presence of mitral valve abnormalities, e.g., mitral stenosis alters the pressure gradients and changes loading conditions of the left ventricle.
- Presence of aortic insufficiency - aortic incompetence results in a rapid rise in the left ventricular diastolic pressure, limiting the gradient across the mitral valve during diastole.
- Heart rate and rhythm - loss of a normal atrial rhythm (e.g., atrial fibrillation causes loss of the A wave). The height of the E wave becomes dependent on the length of the cardiac cycle (variable) rather than a measure of diastolic function. Similarly, pacing and tachycardia result in alterations, whereas bradycardia increases the E/A ratio.

These are some of the disadvantages of first generation testing methods.

Diastolic function should be assessed normally in addition to the twenty views. It is important in establishing a number of cardiac conditions, e.g., pericardial tamponade (where E/A ratios across the tricuspid valve are often more important), restrictive cardiomyopathy vs. constrictive pericarditis.
