= Tissue Doppler echocardiography =

- Purpose: measures the velocity of heart muscle

Tissue Doppler echocardiography (TDE) is a medical ultrasound technology, specifically a form of echocardiography that measures the velocity of the heart muscle (myocardium) through the phases of one or more heartbeats by the Doppler effect (frequency shift) of the reflected ultrasound. The technique is the same as for flow Doppler echocardiography measuring flow velocities. Tissue signals, however, have higher amplitude and lower velocities, and the signals are extracted by using different filter and gain settings. The terms tissue Doppler imaging (TDI) and tissue velocity imaging (TVI) are usually synonymous with TDE because echocardiography is the main use of tissue Doppler.

Like Doppler flow, tissue Doppler can be acquired both by spectral analysis (spectral density estimation) as pulsed Doppler and by the autocorrelation technique as colour tissue Doppler (duplex ultrasonography). While pulsed Doppler only acquires the velocity at one point at a time, colour Doppler can acquire simultaneous pixel velocity values across the whole imaging field. Pulsed Doppler on the other hand, is more robust against noise, as peak values are measured on top of the spectrum, and are unaffected of the presence of clutter (stationary reverberation noise).

== Pulsed tissue Doppler echocardiography ==
This has become a major echocardiographic tool for assessment of both systolic and diastolic ventricular function. However, as this is a spectral technique, it is important to realise that measurement of peak values is dependent on the width of the spectrum, which again is a function of gain setting.

=== Clinical use ===
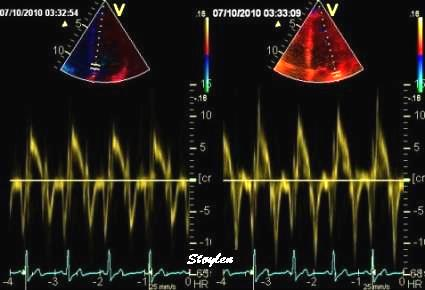
Spectral tissue velocity curves from the mitral annulus at the septal (left) and lateral (right) points. The curves show multiple heartbeats.

Pulsed wave spectral tissue Doppler has become a universal tool that is part of the general echocardiographic examination. Like any other echocardiographic measurement, measures by tissue Doppler should be interpreted in the context of the whole examination. The velocity curves are in general taken from the base of the mitral annulus at the insertion of the mitral leaflets, in the septal and lateral points of the four chamber view, and eventually the anterior and inferior points of the two-chamber views. For the right ventricle it is customary to use the lateral point of the tricuspid annulus only. Averaging peak velocities from the septal and lateral point has become common, although it has been shown that averaging all four points mentioned above, gives significantly less variability

The method measures annular velocities to and from the probe during the heart cycle.

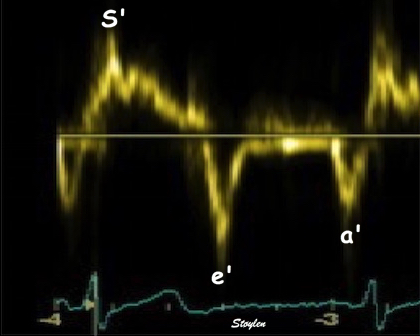
Single spectral tissue velocity curve from the mitral annulus. The curve shows velocities towards the probe (positive velocity) in systole, and away from the probe (negative velocities) in diastole. The most useful measures are the peak velocities, in systole S' and in early diastole (e') and late diastole during atrial contraction (a').

Annular velocities summarize the longitudinal contraction of the ventricle during systole, and elongation during diastole. Peak velocities are commonly used.

==== Systolic function ====
Peak systolic annular velocity (S') of the left ventricle is as close to a contractility measure as you can get by imaging (bearing in mind that any imaging method only measures the result of fibre shortening, without measuring myocyte tension). S' has become a reliable measure of global function It shares the advantage of annular displacement, that it is reduced also in hypertrophic hearts with small ventricles and normal ejection fraction (HFNEF), which is often seen in Hypertensive heart disease, Hypertrophic cardiomyopathy and Aortic stenosis.

Likewise, peak tricuspid annular systolic velocity has become a measure of the right ventricular systolic function

==== Diastolic function ====
As the ventricle relaxes, the annulus moves towards the base of the heart, signifying the volume expansion of the ventricle. The peak mitral annular velocity during early filling, e' is a measure of left ventricular diastolic function, and has been shown to be relatively independent of left ventricular filling pressure. If there is impaired relaxation (Diastolic dysfunction), the e' velocity decreases. After the early relaxation, the ventricular myocardium is passive, the late velocity peak a' is a function of atrial contraction. The ratio between e' and a' is also a measure of diastolic function, in addition to the absolute values.

During the two filling phases, there is early (E) and late (A) blood flow from the atrium to the ventricle, corresponding to the annular velocity phases. The flow, is driven by the pressure difference between atrium and ventricle, this pressure difference is both a function of the pressure drop during early relaxation and the initial atrial pressure. In light diastolic dysfunction, the peak early mitral flow velocity E is reduced in proportion to the e', but if relaxation is so reduced that it causes increase in atrial pressure, E will increase again, while e', being less load dependent, remains low. Thus, the ratio E/e' is related to the atrial pressure, and can show increased filling pressure although with several reservations. In the right ventricle this is not an important principle, as the right atrial pressure is the same as central venous pressure which can easily be assessed from venous congestion.

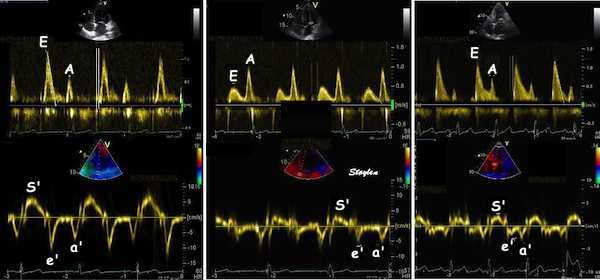
relation between mitral flow and mitral annulus velocity. Left: Normal person with good diastolic function; high E and e', normal E/e'. Middle, patient with diastolic dysfunction without increased filling pressure; low E and e', normal E/e' ratio. Left, patient with diastolic dysfunction and increased filling pressure; high E, low e' and high E/e'. The S' is reduced in proportion to the e'

==== Heart failure with preserved ejection fraction (HFPEF) ====
One of the main advantages of tissue Doppler is that diastolic and systolic function can be measured by the same tool. Before the advent of tissue Doppler, systolic function was usually assessed with ejection fraction (EF), and diastolic function by mitral flow. This led to the concept of pure "diastolic heart failure". However, In hypertrophic left ventricles with small cavity size, the systolic function is reduced although EF is not, as the EF is dependent on the relative wall thickness. This has led to the concept of "pure diastolic heart failure" being discarded. The preferred term is now heart failure with normal ejection fraction (HFNEF) or heart failure with preserved ejection fraction (HFPEF). This is common and is often seen in hypertensive heart disease, hypertrophic cardiomyopathy and aortic stenosis, and may comprise as much as 50% of the total heart failure population. The prognosis of HFPEF is the same as for heart failure with dilated hearts.

==== Mitral valve prolapse (MVP) ====
Pulsed-wave tissue Doppler can be used as a way to evaluate the severeness of arrhythmic mitral valve prolapse, by looking at the peak in the middle of the systole, which looks similar to Prussian Pickelhaube helmet, hence the name Pickelhaube spike. This is one of the risk markers for malignant arrhythmias in patients with myxomatous mitral valve disease (MMVD) and bileaflet mitral valve prolapse (BMVP). It's significant when exceeds 16 cm/s. The sudden systolic overload of which Pickelhaube spike is an expression can act as a trigger for the onset of ventricular arrhythmias.

=== Normal values and physiology ===
Normal gender and age related reference values For both S', e' and a' have been established in the large HUNT study, comprising 1266 subjects free of heart disease, hypertension and diabetes.

This study also shows that both S' and e' values decline with age, while a' increases (fig). There is also a significant correlation between S' and e', also in healthy subjects, showing the connection between systolic and diastolic function.

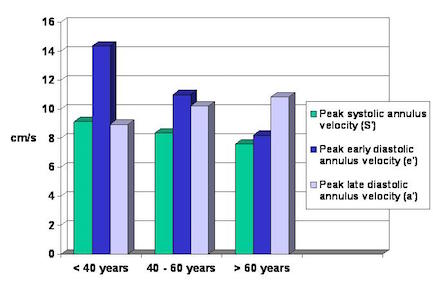
Age dependent normal values for S', e' and a'.

The e'/a' ratio becomes <1 about 60 years of age, which is similar to the E/A ratio of mitral flow. Women has slightly higher S' and e' velocities than men, although the difference disappears with age. The study also did show that velocities were highest in the lateral wall, and lowest in the septum. The E/e' was thus dependent on the site of e' measurement. The ratio was also age dependent.

== Colour tissue Doppler ==
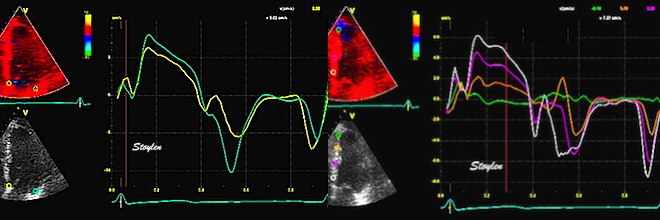
Colour tissue Doppler traces from a normal subject Left: traces from the septum and mitral ring. The similarities of the curve shape to spectral Doppler is evident. Right: multiple traces from sites along the septum. The decreasing velocities from base to apex is evident.

Unlike spectral Doppler, colour tissue Doppler samples velocities from all points of the sector, by shooting two pulses successively, and calculating the velocity from the phase shift between them by autocorrelation. The calculation is slightly different from the true Doppler effect, but the result becomes identical. This results in a single velocity value per sample volume. The result is a velocity field of (nearly) simultaneous velocity vectors towards the probe. The advantage of colour Doppler over spectral Doppler is that all velocities can be sampled simultaneously. The disadvantage is that if there is clutter noise (stationary reverberations), the stationary echoes will be integrated in the velocity calculation, resulting in an under estimate. As pulsed wave Doppler are displayed as a spectrum, the colour Doppler values will correspond to the mean of the spectrum (in the absence of clutter), giving slightly lower values. In the HUNT study, the difference in peak systolic values were about 1.5 cm/s.

The local velocities are not the result of the local function, as segments are moved by the action of neighbouring segments. Thus the velocity differences velocity gradient are the main measure of regional contraction, and has become the most important employment of colour tissue Doppler, in the method of strain rate imaging.

== Objections ==
There are philosophical, methodological and applicational flaws in tissue Doppler. Doppler methodology and mensuration are suitable for flow but unsuitable for tissue application. In contrast to the regular Doppler which is High Velocity Flow Doppler (HVFD) it is better to call tissue Doppler as Low Velocity Flow Doppler (LVFD).

Thus, in tissue Doppler, velocity measurements are unscientific due to flaws in application of measurement and Doppler methodology. There is no diagnostic directional information which is vital in Doppler studies. It has poor spatial resolution and is very sensitive - resulting in false positive data. The audio output is useless. Tissue Doppler has no particular advantage in the current form but may be used to study low flow thrombogenic states like spontaneous echo contrasts.
