= Diastasis (pathology) =

Separation of parts of the body that are normally joined

In pathology, diastasis is the separation of parts of the body that are normally joined, such as the separation of certain abdominal muscles during pregnancy, or of adjacent bones without fracture.

== See also ==
- Diastasis recti
- Diastasis symphysis pubis

Compare with:

- Diastasis (physiology)
