= Diastole =

Part of the cardiac cycle

Early ventricular diastole is the filling of blood from the atria (from the left atrium shown in pink, and from the right atrium shown in blue) that weakly contract letting blood fill into the ventricles; in late ventricular diastole, the two atria begin to contract (atrial systole), forcing additional blood flow into the ventricles.

Diastole (/daɪˈæstəli/ dy-AST-ə-lee) is the relaxed phase of the cardiac cycle when the chambers of the heart are refilling with blood. The contrasting phase is systole when the heart chambers are contracting. Atrial diastole is the relaxing of the atria, and ventricular diastole the relaxing of the ventricles.

The term originates from the Greek word διαστολή (diastolē), meaning "dilation", from διά (diá, "apart") + στέλλειν (stéllein, "to send").

== Role in cardiac cycle ==
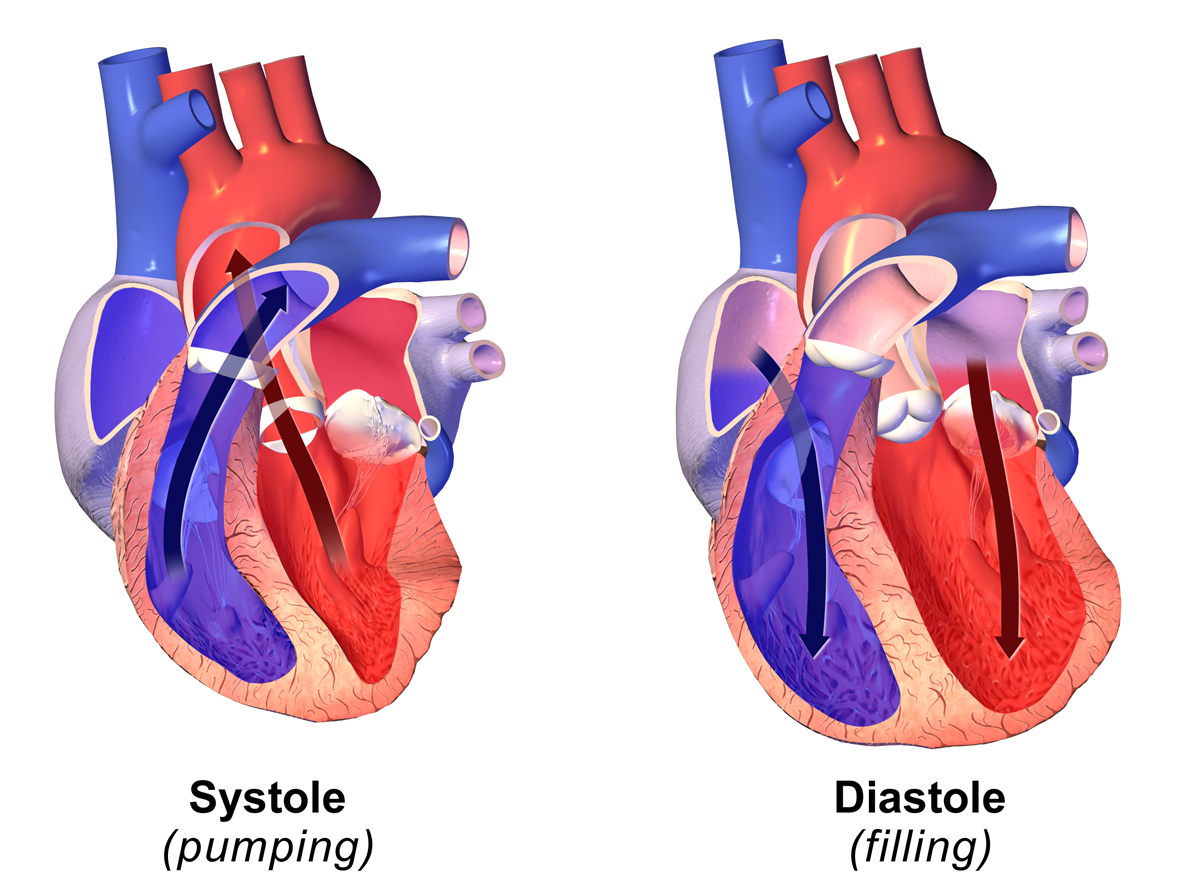

A Wiggers diagram, showing various events during diastole. During early ventricular diastole—see vertical bar marked "Isovolumetric relaxation"—pressure in each ventricle (light-blue trace) begins to drop quickly from the wave height reached during systole. When ventricular pressures fall below those in the atrial chambers the atrioventricular (mitral and tricuspid) valves open, causing blood volume (red trace) in the atria to flow into the ventricles. In late ventricular diastole, the two atrial chambers begin to contract (atrial systole), causing blood pressure in both atria to increase and forcing additional blood volume into the ventricles. This beginning of the atrial systole is known as the atrial kick—see "Ventricular volume" trace (red) directly above the P-wave in the electrocardiogram trace (dark-blue).

A typical heart rate is 75 beats per minute (bpm), which means that the cardiac cycle that produces one heartbeat, lasts for less than one second. The cycle requires 0.3 sec in ventricular systole (contraction)—pumping blood to all body systems from the two ventricles; and 0.5 sec in diastole (dilation), re-filling the four chambers of the heart, for a total of 0.8 sec to complete the cycle.

=== Early ventricular diastole ===
During early ventricular diastole, pressure in the two ventricles begins to drop from the peak reached during systole. When the pressure in the left ventricle falls below that in the left atrium, the mitral valve opens due to a negative pressure differential (suction) between the two chambers. The open mitral valve allows blood in the atrium (accumulated during atrial diastole) to flow into the ventricle (see graphic at top). Likewise, the same phenomenon runs simultaneously in the right ventricle and right atrium through the tricuspid valve.

The ventricular filling flow (or flow from the atria into the ventricles) has an early (E) diastolic component caused by ventricular suction, and then a late one created by atrial systole (A). The E/A ratio is used as a diagnostic measure as its diminishment indicates probable diastolic dysfunction, though this should be used in conjunction with other clinical characteristics and not by itself.

=== Late ventricular diastole ===
Early diastole is a suction mechanism between the atrial and ventricular chambers. Then, in late ventricular diastole, the two atrial chambers contract (atrial systole), causing blood pressure in both atria to increase and forcing additional blood flow into the ventricles. This beginning of the atrial systole is known as the atrial kick—see Wiggers diagram. The atrial kick does not supply the larger amount of flow (during the cardiac cycle) as about 80 percent of the collected blood volume flows into the ventricles during the active suction period.

=== Atrial diastole ===
At the beginning of the cardiac cycle the atria, and the ventricles are synchronously approaching and retreating from relaxation and dilation, or diastole. The atria are filling with separate blood volumes returning to the right atrium (from the vena cavae), and to the left atrium (from the lungs). After chamber and back pressures equalize, the mitral and tricuspid valves open, and the returning blood flows through the atria into the ventricles. When the ventricles have completed most of their filling, the atria begin to contract (atrial systole), forcing blood under pressure into the ventricles. Now the ventricles start to contract, and as pressures within the ventricles rise, the mitral and tricuspid valves close producing the first heart sound (S1) as heard with a stethoscope.

As pressures within the ventricles continue to rise, they exceed the "back pressures" in the aorta, and the pulmonary trunk. The aortic and pulmonary valves known as the semilunar valves open, and a defined fraction of blood within the heart is ejected into the aorta and pulmonary trunk. Ejection of blood from the heart is known as systole. Ejection causes pressure within the ventricles to fall, and, simultaneously, the atria begin to refill (atrial diastole). Finally, pressures within the ventricles fall below the back pressures in the aorta and the pulmonary arteries, and the semilunar valves close. Closure of these valves give the second heart sound (S2). The ventricles then start to relax, the mitral and tricuspid valves begin to open, and the cycle begins again.

In summary, when the ventricles are in systole and contracting, the atria are relaxed and collecting returning blood. When, in late diastole, the ventricles become fully dilated (understood in imaging as LVEDV and RVEDV), the atria begin to contract, pumping blood to the ventricles. The atria feed a steady supply of blood to the ventricles, thereby serving as a reservoir to the ventricles and ensuring that these pumps never run dry. This coordination ensures that blood is pumped and circulated efficiently throughout the body.

== Clinical notation ==
Blood pressure is usually written with the systolic pressure expressed over the diastolic pressure or separated by a slash, for example, 120/80 mmHg. This clinical notation is not a mathematical figure for a fraction or ratio, nor a display of a numerator over a denominator, rather it is a medical notation showing the two clinically significant pressures involved. It is often shown followed by a third value, the number of beats per minute of the heart rate.

Mean blood pressure is also an important determinant in people who have had certain medical interventions like Left Ventricular Assist Devices (LVAD) and hemodialysis that replace pulsatile flow with continuous blood flow.

== Diagnostic value ==
Examining diastolic function during a cardiac stress test is a good way to test for heart failure with preserved ejection fraction.

Classification of blood pressure in adults:

Blood Pressure Classification	Systolic BP (mmHg)	Diastolic BP (mmHg)
Optimal	<120	and <80
Prehypertension	120–139	or 80–89
Stage 1 Hypertension	140–159	or 90–99
Stage 2 Hypertension	≥160	or ≥100

== Effects of impaired diastolic function ==
Brain natriuretic peptide (BNP) is a cardiac neurohormone secreted from ventricular myocytes (ventricular muscle cells) at the end of diastole—this in response to the normal, or sub-normal (as the case may be), stretching of cardiomyocytes (heart muscle cells) during systole. Elevated levels of BNP indicate excessive natriuresis (excretion of sodium to the urine) and decline of ventricular function, especially during diastole. Increased BNP concentrations have been found in patients who experience diastolic heart failure.

Impaired diastolic function can result from the decreased compliance of ventricular myocytes, and thus the ventricles, which means the heart muscle does not stretch as much as needed during filling. This will result in a reduced end diastolic volume (EDV) and, according to the Frank-Starling mechanism, a reduced EDV will lead to a reduced stroke volume, thus a reduced cardiac output. Over time, decreased cardiac output will diminish the ability of the heart to circulate blood efficiently throughout the body. Degradation of compliance in the myocardium is a natural consequence of aging.
