= Systole =

Part of the cardiac cycle when a heart chamber contracts

The cardiac cycle at the point of beginning a ventricular systole, or contraction: 1) newly oxygenated blood (red arrow) in the left ventricle begins pulsing through the aortic valve to supply all body systems; 2) oxygen-depleted blood (blue arrow) in the right ventricle begins pulsing through the pulmonic (pulmonary) valve en route to the lungs for reoxygenation.

Systole (/ˈsɪstəli/ SIST-ə-lee) is the part of the cardiac cycle during which some chambers of the heart contract after refilling with blood. Its contrasting phase is diastole, the relaxed phase of the cardiac cycle when the chambers of the heart are refilling with blood.

== Etymology ==
The term originates, via Neo-Latin, from Ancient Greek συστολή (sustolē), from συστέλλειν (sustéllein 'to contract'; from σύν sun 'together' + στέλλειν stéllein 'to send'), and is similar to the use of the English term to squeeze.

== Terminology, general explanation ==
Electrical waves track a systole (a contraction) of the heart. The end-point of the P wave depolarization is the start-point of the atrial stage of systole. The ventricular stage of systole begins at the R peak of the QRS wave complex; the T wave indicates the end of ventricular contraction, after which ventricular relaxation (ventricular diastole) begins.

The mammalian heart has four chambers: the left atrium above the left ventricle (lighter pink, see graphic), which two are connected through the mitral (or bicuspid) valve; and the right atrium above the right ventricle (lighter blue), connected through the tricuspid valve. The atria are the receiving blood chambers for the circulation of blood and the ventricles are the discharging chambers.

In late ventricular diastole, the atrial chambers contract and send blood to the ventricles. This flow fills the ventricles with blood, and the resulting pressure closes the valves to the atria. The ventricles now perform isovolumetric contraction, which is contraction while all valves are closed. This contraction ends the first stage of systole. The second stage proceeds immediately, pumping oxygenated blood from the left ventricle through the aortic valve and aorta to all body systems, and simultaneously pumping oxygen-poor blood from the right ventricle through the pulmonic valve and pulmonary artery to the lungs. Thus, the pairs of chambers (upper atria and lower ventricles) contract in alternating sequence to each other. First, atrial contraction feeds blood into the ventricles, then ventricular contraction pumps blood out of the heart to the body systems, including the lungs for resupply of oxygen.

Cardiac systole is the contraction of the cardiac muscle in response to an electrochemical stimulus to the heart's cells (cardiomyocytes).

Cardiac output is the volume of blood pumped by the ventricles in one minute. The ejection fraction is the volume of blood pumped divided by the total volume of blood in the left ventricle.

== Types of systole ==
=== Atrial systole ===
The cardiac cycle at beginning of atrial systole: The left (red) and right (blue) ventricles begin to fill during ventricular diastole. Then, after tracing the P wave of the ECG, the two atria begin contracting (systole), pulsing blood under pressure into the ventricles.

Atrial systole occurs late in ventricular diastole and represents the contraction of myocardium of the left and right atria. The sharp decrease in ventricular pressure that occurs during ventricular diastole allows the atrioventricular valves (or mitral and tricuspid valves) to open and causes the contents of the atria to empty into the ventricles. The atrioventricular valves remain open while the aortic and pulmonary valves remain closed because the pressure gradient between the atrium and ventricle is preserved during late ventricular diastole. Atrial contraction confers a minor-fraction addition to ventricular filling, but becomes significant in left ventricular hypertrophy, or thickening of the heart wall, as the ventricle does not fully relax during its diastole. Loss of normal electrical conduction in the heart—as seen during atrial fibrillation, atrial flutter, and complete heart block—may eliminate atrial systole completely.

Contraction of the atria follows depolarization, represented by the P wave of the ECG. As both atrial chambers contract—from the superior region of the atria toward the atrioventricular septum—pressure rises within the atria and blood is pumped into the ventricles through the open atrioventricular valves. At the start of atrial systole, during ventricular diastole, the ventricles are normally filled to about 70–80 percent of capacity by inflow from the atria. Atrial contraction also referred to as the "atrial kick," contributes the remaining 20–30 percent of ventricular filling. Atrial systole lasts approximately 100 ms and ends prior to ventricular systole, as the atrial muscle returns to diastole.

The two ventricles are isolated electrically and histologically (tissue-wise) from the two atrial chambers by electrically impermeable collagen layers of connective tissue known as the cardiac skeleton. The cardiac skeleton is made of dense connective tissue which gives structure to the heart by forming the atrioventricular septum—which separates the atria from the ventricles—and the fibrous rings which serve as bases for the four heart valves. Collagen extensions from the valve rings seal and limit electrical activity of the atria from influencing electrical pathways that cross the ventricles. These electrical pathways contain the sinoatrial node, the atrioventricular node, and the Purkinje fibers. (Exceptions such as accessory pathways may occur in this firewall between atrial and ventricular electrical influence but are rare.)

Cardiac rate control via pharmacology is common today; for example, the therapeutic use of digoxin, beta adrenoceptor antagonists, or calcium channel blockers are important historical interventions in this condition. Notably, individuals prone to hypercoagulability (abnormality of blood coagulation) are at decided risk of blood clotting, a very serious pathology requiring therapy for life with an anticoagulant if it cannot be corrected.

==== Right and left atrial systoles ====
The atrial chambers each contains one valve: the tricuspid valve in the right atrium opens into the right ventricle, and the mitral (or bicuspid) valve in the left atrium opens into the left ventricle. Both valves are pressed open during the late stages of ventricular diastole; see Wiggers diagram at the P/QRS phase (at right margin). Then the contractions of atrial systole cause the right ventricle to fill with oxygen-depleted blood through the tricuspid valve. When the right atrium is emptied—or prematurely closed—right atrial systole ends, and this stage signals the end of ventricular diastole and the beginning of ventricular systole (see Wiggers diagram). The time variable for the right systolic cycle is measured from (tricuspid) valve-open to valve-closed.

The contractions of atrial systole fill the left ventricle with oxygen-enriched blood through the mitral valve; when the left atrium is emptied or closed, left atrial systole is ended and ventricular systole is about to begin. The time variable for the left systolic cycle is measured from (mitral) valve-open to valve-closed.

==== Atrial fibrillation ====
Atrial fibrillation represents a common electrical malady in the heart that appears during the time interval of atrial systole (see figure at right margin). Theory suggests that an ectopic focus, usually situated within the pulmonary trunks, competes with the sinoatrial node for electrical control of the atrial chambers and thereby diminishes the performance of the atrial myocardium, or atrial heart muscle. The ordered, sinoatrial control of atrial electrical activity is disrupted, causing the loss of coordinated generation of pressure in the two atrial chambers. Atrial fibrillation represents an electrically disordered but well perfused atrial mass working (in an uncoordinated fashion) with a (comparatively) electrically healthy ventricular systole.

The compromised load caused by atrial fibrillation detracts from the overall performance of the heart, but the ventricles continue to work as an effective pump. Given this pathology, the ejection fraction may deteriorate by ten to thirty percent. Uncorrected atrial fibrillation can lead to heart rates approaching 200 beats per minute (bpm). If this rate can be slowed to a normal range, say about 80 bpm, the resultant longer fill-time within the cardiac cycle restores or improves the pumping capability of the heart. The labored breathing, for example, of individuals with uncontrolled atrial fibrillation, can often be returned to normal by (electrical or medical) cardioversion.

=== Ventricular systole and Wiggers diagram ===
A Wiggers diagram, showing various events during systole (here primarily displayed as ventricular systole, or ventricular contraction). The very short interval (about 0.03 second) of isovolumetric, or fixed-volume, contraction begins (see upper left) at the R peak of the QRS complex on the electrocardiogram graph-line. + Ejection phase begins immediately after isovolumetric contraction—ventricular volume (red graph-line) begins to decrease as ventricular pressure (light blue graph-line) continues to increase; then pressure drops as it enters diastole.

A Wiggers diagram of ventricular systole graphically depicts the sequence of contractions by the myocardium of the two ventricles. Ventricular systole induces self-contraction such that pressure in both left and right ventricles rises to a level above that in the two atrial chambers, thereby closing the tricuspid and mitral valves—which are prevented from inverting by the chordae tendineae and the papillary muscles. Now ventricular pressure continues to rise in isovolumetric, or fixed-volume, contraction phase until maximal pressure (dP/dt = 0) occurs, causing the pulmonary and aortic valves to open in ejection phase. In ejection phase, blood flows from the two ventricles down its pressure gradient—that is, 'down' from higher pressure to lower pressure—into (and through) the aorta and the pulmonary trunk respectively. Notably, cardiac muscle perfusion through the heart's coronary vessels does not happen during ventricular systole; rather, it occurs during ventricular diastole.

Ventricular systole is the origin of the pulse.

==== Right and left ventricular systoles ====
The pulmonary (or pulmonic) valve in the right ventricle opens into the pulmonary trunk, also known as the pulmonary artery, which divides twice to connect to each of the left and right lungs. In the left ventricle, the aortic valve opens into the aorta which divides and re-divides into the several branch arteries that connect to all body organs and systems except the lungs.

By its contractions, right ventricular (RV) systole pulses oxygen-depleted blood through the pulmonary valve through the pulmonary arteries to the lungs, providing pulmonary circulation; simultaneously, left ventricular (LV) systole pumps blood through the aortic valve, the aorta, and all the arteries to provide systemic circulation of oxygenated blood to all body systems. The left ventricular systole enables blood pressure to be routinely measured in the larger arteries of the left ventricle of the heart.

LV systole is volumetrically defined as the left ventricular ejection fraction (LVEF). Similarly, RV systole is defined as the right ventricular ejection fraction (RVEF). Higher than normal RVEF is indicative of pulmonary hypertension. The time variables of the ventricular systoles are: right ventricle, pulmonary valve-open to valve-closed; left ventricle, aortic valve-open to valve-closed.

=== Electrical systole ===
The sinoatrial node (S-A Node) is the heart's natural pacemaker, issuing electrical signaling that travels through the heart muscle, causing it to contract repeatedly in cycle. It is situated at the top of the right atrium adjacent to the junction with the superior vena cava. The S-A Node is a pale yellow structure. For humans, it is approximately 25 mm long, 3–4 mm wide and 2 mm thick. It contains two types of cells: (a) the small, round P cells which have very few organelles and myofibrils, and (b) the slender elongated transitional cells, which are intermediate in appearance between the P and the ordinary myocardial cells. Intact, the SA node provides continual electrical discharge known as sinus rhythm through the atrial mass, the signals of which then coalesce at the atrioventricular node, there to be organized to provide a rhythmic electrical pulse into and across the ventricles through sodium-, potassium- or calcium-gated ion channels.

The continual rhythmic discharge generates a wavelike movement of electrical ripples that stimulate the smooth muscles of the myocardium and cause rhythmic contractions to progress from top to bottom of the heart. As the pulse moves out of the (upper) atria into the (lower) ventricles, it is distributed throughout a muscular network to cause systolic contraction of both ventricular chambers simultaneously. The actual pace of the cycle—just how fast or slowly the heart beats—is cued by messages from the brain, reflecting the brain's responses to conditions of the body, such as pain, emotional stress, level of activity, and to ambient conditions including external temperature, time of day, etc.

=== Mechanical systole ===
Electrical systole opens voltage-gated sodium, potassium and calcium channels in cells of myocardium tissue. Subsequently, a rise in intracellular calcium triggers the interaction of actin and myosin in the presence of ATP which generates mechanical force in the cells in the form of muscular contraction, or mechanical systole. The contractions generate intra-ventricular pressure, which is increased until it exceeds the external, residual pressures in the adjacent trunks of both the pulmonary artery and the aorta; this stage, in turn, causes the pulmonary and aortic valves to open. Blood is then ejected from the two ventricles, pulsing into both the pulmonic and aortic circulation systems.

Mechanical systole causes the pulse, which itself is readily palpated (felt) or seen at several points on the body, enabling universally adopted methods—by touch or by eye—for observing systolic blood pressure. The mechanical forces of systole cause rotation of the muscle mass around the long and short axes, a process that can be observed as a "wringing" of the ventricles.

== Physiological mechanism ==
Systole of the heart is initiated by electrically excitable cells situated in the sinoatrial node. These cells are activated spontaneously by depolarization of the electrical potential across their cell membranes, which causes voltage-gated calcium channels on the cell membrane to open and allow calcium ions to pass through into the sarcoplasm (cytoplasm) of cardiac muscle cells. Calcium ions bind to molecular receptors on the sarcoplasmic reticulum (see graphic), which causes a flux (flow) of calcium ions into the sarcoplasm.

Calcium ions bind to troponin C, causing a conformational (i.e., structural) change in the troponin-tropomyosin protein complex, causing the myosin head (binding) sites on F-actin filamentous proteins to be exposed, which causes muscle contraction to occur. The cardiac action potential spreads distally (or outwardly) to the small branches of the Purkinje tree via the flux of cations through gap junctions that connect the sarcoplasms of adjacent myocytes.

The electrical activity of ventricular systole is coordinated by the atrioventricular node, which is a discrete collection of cells that receives electrical stimulation from the left and right atria and can provide an intrinsic (albeit slower) heart pacemaker activity. The cardiac action potential is propagated down electrical pathways through the bundle of His to the Purkinje fibres; this electrical flux causes coordinated depolarisation and excitation-contraction coupling from the apex of the heart up to the roots of the great vessels.

== Clinical notation ==
When blood pressure is stated for medical purposes, it is usually written with the systolic and diastolic pressures separated by a slash, for example, 120/80 mmHg. This clinical notation is not a mathematical figure for a fraction or ratio, nor a display of a numerator over a denominator. Rather, it is a medical notation showing the two clinically significant pressures involved (systole followed by diastole). It is often shown followed by a third number, the value of the heart rate (in beats per minute), which typically is measured jointly with blood pressure readings.

== Pathology ==
Systolic malfunction.

== See also ==
- Wiggers diagram
- Systole (mathematics)
- Diastole
- Blood pressure
