= Wiggers diagram =

Teaching aid in cardiac physiology

A Wiggers diagram modified from

A Wiggers diagram, named after its developer, Carl Wiggers, is a unique diagram that has been used in teaching cardiac physiology for more than a century. In the Wiggers diagram, the X-axis is used to plot time subdivided into the cardiac phases, while the Y-axis typically contains the following on a single grid:

- Blood pressure
  - Aortic pressure
  - Ventricular pressure
  - Atrial pressure
- Ventricular volume
- Electrocardiogram
- Arterial flow (optional)
- Heart sounds (optional)

The Wiggers diagram clearly illustrates the coordinated variation of these values as the heart beats, assisting one in understanding the entire cardiac cycle.

== Events ==
	Phase	EKG	Heart sounds	Semilunar valves	Atrioventricular valves
A	Atrial systole	P	S4*	closed	open
B	Ventricular systole – Isovolumetric/isovolumic contraction	QRS	S1 ("lub")	closed	closed
C1	Ventricular systole – Ejection 1	ST		open	closed
C2	Ventricular systole – Ejection 2	T		open	closed
D	Ventricular diastole – Isovolumetric/isovolumic relaxation	–	S2 ("dub")	closed	closed
E1	Ventricular diastole – Ventricular filling 1	–	S3*	closed	open
E2	Ventricular diastole – Ventricular filling 2	–		closed	open

Note that during isovolumetric/isovolumic contraction and relaxation, all the heart valves are closed; at no time are all the heart valves open. *S3 and S4 heart sounds are associated with pathologies and are not routinely heard.

== Additional images ==
Ventricular systole

Cardiac diastole

ECG

The EKG complex. P=P wave, PR=PR interval, QRS=QRS complex, QT=QT interval, ST=ST segment, T=T wave

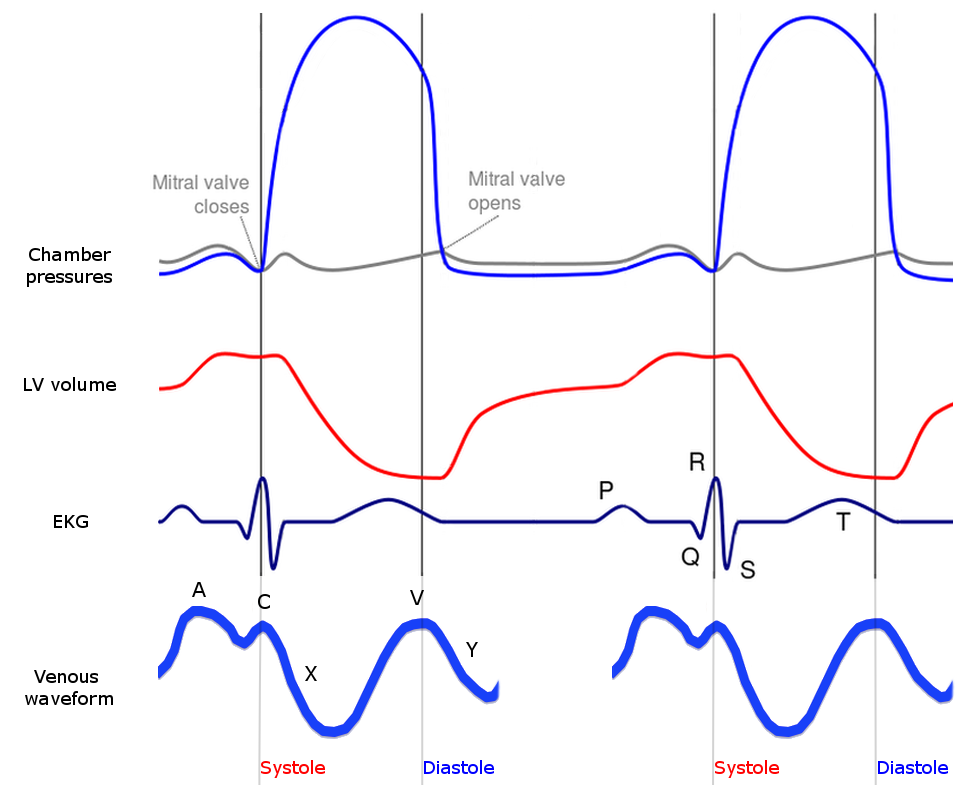
Wiggers with jugular venous waveform

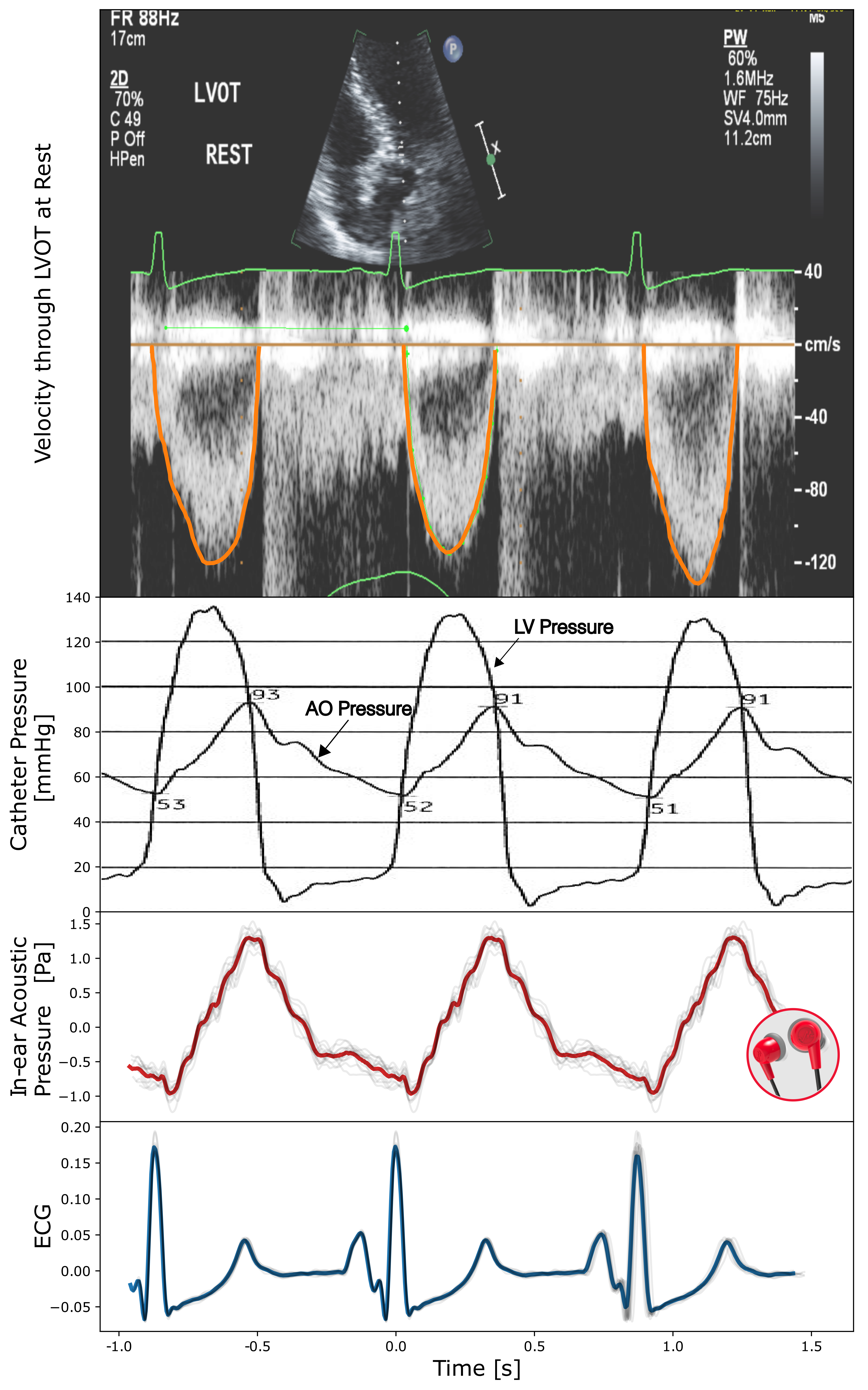
Wiggers diagram with mechanical (echo), electrical (ECG), and aortic pressure (catheter) waveforms, together with an in-ear dynamic pressure waveform measured using a novel infrasonic hemodynography technology, for a patient with severe aortic stenosis. Modified from

== See also ==
- Pressure volume diagram
