= Horace Smithy =

American cardiac surgeon

- Born: July 19, 1914; Norfolk, Virginia
- Died: October 28, 1948 (aged 34); Charleston, South Carolina
- Education: UVA School of Medicine
- Years active: 1942–1948
- Medical career
- Field: Cardiac surgery
- Institutions: Medical College of South Carolina
- Research: Heart valve repair

Horace Gilbert Smithy Jr. (July 19, 1914 – October 28, 1948) was an American cardiac surgeon who in 1948 performed the first successful mitral valve repair (mitral valvulotomy) since the 1920s. Smithy's work was complicated because it predated heart-lung machines or open heart surgery. Though his procedure did not become a definitive treatment for valvular heart disease, he introduced the technique of injecting novocaine into the heart to avoid arrhythmias during surgery, and he showed that it was feasible to access and operate on the heart's valves.

A graduate of the University of Virginia School of Medicine, Smithy completed a surgical residency in Charleston, South Carolina, and then practiced surgery at Roper Hospital in Charleston. He also began working with a colleague in a dog laboratory to devise a valvulotomy (surgical treatment for diseased heart valves). Smithy's interest in heart valve dysfunction was also personal; he suffered from narrowing of the aortic valve related to rheumatic heart disease.

As Smithy began to operate on a series of patients with heart valve disease, he started to correspond with eminent heart surgeon Alfred Blalock, hoping that ultimately Blalock would agree to perform a valvulotomy on him. Smithy had a patient come to Baltimore so that Blalock and Smithy could operate on the patient together. When that patient died on the operating table, Blalock refused to be involved with further surgery of that type. Smithy died at Roper Hospital of cardiac asthma, pneumonia and another attack of rheumatic fever. His death came a few months after he performed his first valvulotomy; he had been unable to convince anyone to perform the surgery on him.

== Early life ==
Smithy was born in Norfolk, Virginia. He was the son of Rosalia (née McCormick) and Horace Smithy Sr. The elder Smithy, who was lifelong friends with Assistant Secretary of Commerce Monroe Johnson, worked in real estate before acquiring his own 50-person real estate brokerage firm, the H. G. Smithy Company. Until high school, Horace Jr. was educated at the Friends School in Washington. At some point during his childhood, he suffered from rheumatic fever. Smithy attended Episcopal High School in Alexandria, Virginia. He was becoming sick with frequent colds, which were thought to be weather-related, so he was sent to the Miami Military Academy.

For college, Smithy went to the University of Florida and became a multisport athlete there (football, baseball and boxing). The New York Times indicated that he once boxed professionally and played professional baseball. Smithy went to the University of Virginia for medical school. When he bought a stethoscope at the beginning of his studies, he listened to his own heart and noted a loud murmur. While in medical school, Smithy married Sarah (née Rankin), whom he had met while studying in Florida. They had two children.

== Early career ==
Smithy moved on to a surgical internship and residency at the Medical College of South Carolina in Charleston. He may have chosen to go to Charleston in part because the father of a high school classmate had once been the chief surgeon and residency program director at Roper Hospital. The hospital was not affiliated with the medical school when his classmate's father worked there, but it was the medical school's primary teaching site when Smithy arrived. Remaining at Roper Hospital after finishing his residency in 1942, Smithy established a surgical practice. He also worked in an animal laboratory at the medical school, using dogs to learn more about valve function and possible repair. Smithy's interest in this area was heightened by his own heart valve problem; he suffered from narrowing of the aortic valve related to his childhood bout of rheumatic fever.

By 1946, Smithy had devised what he called a valvulotome, an instrument he used to cut away scar tissue from the aortic valve. He made a presentation on the device at an American College of Surgeons (ACS) forum. The next year at the annual ACS meeting, he gave a more formal presentation. An Associated Press science editor heard Smithy's talk at the 1947 ACS conference and the possible breakthrough was widely published in newspapers. The topic was of wide interest because valvular disease affected so many people at the time. Tuberculosis killed the most people under 50 in the 1940s, but because of the prevalence of rheumatic fever, narrowing of the mitral valve was the next most common cause of death in this age group.

Although the original valvulotome had allowed him to start working on aortic valves, he knew that he needed a more sophisticated device to contend with scar tissue found in the mitral valve. In conjunction with C. D. Coleman, who ran the university's machine shop, he developed a new valvulotome. The device consisted of a plunger inside a hollow tube and a set of jaws. As the plunger was depressed, the jaws closed. The jaws would "bite" out a small portion of the narrowed valve.

== Betty Lee Woolridge ==
In early 1948, Smithy prepared to perform his first heart valve surgery on a human. Although two surgeons had attempted mitral valve surgery on several patients in the 1920s, most of those patients had died and mitral valve repair had not been attempted since then. Smithy's first patient, a 21-year-old woman named Betty Lee Woolridge, had sustained heart valve damage from rheumatic fever at the age of ten. Woolridge explained that she had been in heart failure for two years, that diuretics and dietary modifications were no longer effective, and that she hoped Smithy would operate on her heart.

It appears that Smithy declined Woolridge's initial request for surgical help, but she sent a second letter, asking him why he would continue to experiment on animals when he had a willing human patient. Smithy agreed to have Woolridge come to Charleston for surgery. When she arrived, Woolridge weighed 85 pounds, could not breathe while lying flat, and appeared so frail that Smithy nearly refused to operate on her. Heart failure was causing fluid accumulation in the abdomen; the day before her heart surgery, Smithy drained six liters of fluid off of her abdomen.

Heart surgery on Woolridge commenced on January 30, 1948. After Smithy opened Woolridge's chest, he placed a purse-string suture around the heart so that the heart tissue could be pulled tight to compress the heart muscle around the valvulotome to minimize bleeding. He also injected novocaine into the heart to lessen the risk of arrhythmias. The valvulotome was inserted through a small hole made in the heart. The device was advanced to Woolridge's mitral valve by feel and then used to cut away scar tissue in the valve. Woolridge seemed to recover well. On February 9, Smithy introduced Woolridge at a medical meeting being held in Charleston and she was said to be "up, walking and apparently nearly well."

By February 15, Woolridge had returned to her home in Canton, Ohio. Smithy told reporters that he hoped to perform the same surgery on other patients soon, but that definite results of the surgery could not be determined for at least five years. After Smithy operated on Woolridge, the South Carolina General Assembly issued a resolution in his honor. A couple of weeks later, Woolridge appeared on a radio program to discuss her recovery; illness prevented Smithy from appearing.

By the time of the radio broadcast, Smithy had carried out a second valve surgery; the patient had died. He performed valvulotomies on seven patients by the summer of 1948.

== Operating with Alfred Blalock ==
As Smithy began to perform valvulotomies on humans, he knew that his own heart disease was worsening and that a valvulotomy might be his only hope as a patient. He began corresponding with famed cardiac surgeon Alfred Blalock of Johns Hopkins Hospital, who he thought he could convince to perform the novel procedure. Smithy knew that he would need to demonstrate the procedure's feasibility to Blalock. In their communications, Blalock must have asked for one of Smithy's valvulotomes, as a March 1948 letter from Smithy's secretary indicates that Coleman was about to send one to him.

John Boone, chief of medicine at the Medical College of South Carolina, wrote to Blalock on Smithy's behalf in May 1948. Blalock wrote back within days, asking Smithy to arrange a trip to Johns Hopkins where they could locate a patient and operate together. "Nothing would give me greater pleasure than being able to help you by the use of your method," Blalock wrote. In late June, Smithy sent Blalock a letter indicating that he had a young man from New York whose aortic stenosis was nearly identical to Smithy's. He wrote that the patient was willing to travel to Baltimore for surgery.

Smithy came to Baltimore and did laboratory work with technician Vivien Thomas and resident Denton Cooley. When Smithy and Blalock operated on their first patient, a very sick man between the ages of 35 and 40, things did not go as they had hoped. The events have been described with slight variations, but it seems that the patient developed a fatal arrhythmia while being anesthetized or while the chest incision was being made. Cooley said that he saw Smithy's face drop noticeably when the patient died, perhaps because he saw Blalock as his only chance at having the surgery himself. The patient's death dissuaded Blalock from further involvement in the procedure that Smithy proposed.

== Death ==
In early October 1948, Smithy developed pneumonia and was admitted to Roper Hospital; his condition was further compromised by cardiac asthma and another bout of rheumatic fever. He was scheduled to present a paper at a conference of the American College of Chest Physicians that month. The accounts of Smithy's nurse, Agnes Bowen Kleckley, and an associate, J. M. Stallworth, differ; Smithy either dictated the last few pages of the paper to Stallworth or discussed the remaining portions of the paper with Stallworth for him to finish. In any case, a conference presentation was given by Stallworth and a paper on the surgical treatment of valvular disease was later published in Surgery, Obstetrics & Gynecology.

On October 22, The New York Times reported that complications had ensued and that Smithy was in critical condition. On October 28, Smithy died; he had never been able to undergo surgery on his own aortic valve. An autopsy later showed that the opening in Smithy's aortic valve was smaller than "the point of a knitting needle." More than 300 people came to Smithy's funeral at St. Michael's Episcopal Church in Charleston. Fourteen of his colleagues served as honorary pallbearers.

Woolridge died ten days after Smithy did. Though she died at home, she had been in the hospital frequently after returning to Canton, and she spent two months in the hospital shortly before she died. Four of Smithy's seven valvulotomy patients were still alive and doing well at the time of Woolridge's death. Smithy was posthumously named an "outstanding young man of 1948" by the South Carolina chapter of the Junior Chamber of Commerce. After Smithy died, Blalock exchanged letters with Smithy's widow. Blalock said that he had recently been in Berryville, Virginia, and that he had gone with his wife to the cemetery where Smithy was buried.

== Legacy ==
Ultimately, most of Smithy's success with valvulotomy was short-lived and his procedure was soon replaced with more effective interventions. However, Smithy's intracardiac injection of novocaine significantly decreased the likelihood of arrhythmias that could occur when the heart was surgically manipulated. A Medical University of South Carolina library exhibit says that "[b]etter operations than Smithy's were already accomplished, and their value would become apparent. In going the wrong way, Smithy nonetheless achieved positive results and invited comparisons that eventually led to the realization that commissurotomy was the operation of choice... his work, well publicized at the time, encouraged patients and physicians and prompted the concept that operative treatment of valvular heart disease could be successful."

Heart surgeon Charles P. Bailey, who was working on heart valve surgery at a different institution at the same time as Smithy, later commented on Smithy's personality. He said that though surgeons tended to be egotistical, Smithy was "not only a southern gentleman, but a true gentleman." Bailey recalled a meeting at which he presented some patient data and Smithy was asked to comment on it. Though Smithy had a better success rate on the procedure with a larger number of patients, Smithy did not mention that. Instead, he complimented Bailey on his unique method of opening the mitral valve.

Smithy's family left money to the Medical University of South Carolina after he died. The money built up over time, and after a local surgeon added to the fund, the university created the Horace G. Smithy Chair of Cardiothoracic Surgery in 1997. MUSC hosts the Horace G. Smithy Lecture annually.
