= Pulsus (disambiguation) =

Pulsus may refer to:

== Medical Conditions ==
- Pulsus alternans, a physical finding with arterial pulse waveform
- Pulsus bigeminus, groups of two heartbeats close together followed by a longer pause
- Pulsus bisferiens, a medical condition which an aortic waveform with two peaks per cardiac cycle
- Pulsus paradoxus, a medical condition of an abnormally large decrease in stroke volume, systolic blood pressure and pulse wave amplitude during inspiration

== Other uses ==
- Pulsus Group, a publisher of scientific, technical, and medical literature
