= Richard Gorlin =

American cardiologist (1926-1997)

- Gorlin in 1998
- Born: June 30, 1926; Jersey City, New Jersey, U.S.
- Died: October 16, 1997 (aged 71); Manhattan, New York, U.S.
- Education: Harvard College, Harvard Medical School
- Occupation: Physician
- Known for: Gorlin formula
- Medical career
- Field: Cardiology

Richard Gorlin (June 30, 1926 – October 16, 1997) was an American cardiologist known for his contributions to the fields of valvular heart disease, coronary artery disease and cardiac catheterization, digitalis and vasodilators in congestive heart failure, and thrombolysis in myocardial infarctions. Along with his father, developed the Gorlin formula used to calculate valve areas in aortic valve stenosis and mitral valve stenosis.

== Early life and education ==
Gorlin was born in Jersey City, New Jersey on June 30, 1926, to Sol and Henrietta Gorlin. His father was a mechanical engineer who at the turn of the century is variously reported to have designed hydraulic systems for gasoline engines and worked on building, structural, and real estate projects. Gorlin’s early education was in the Jersey City public school system. Gorlin then entered Harvard College in January 1943 as part of the accelerated wartime program. He spent five semesters at Harvard College and then entered Harvard Medical School in October 1944. He graduated with his Bachelor's degree from Harvard College and his MD degree from Harvard Medical School in 1948 at the age of 21. He served a one-year internship and then completed a two-year cardiology fellowship at the Peter Bent Brigham Hospital. While at the Brigham, he studied cardiology under the direction of Dr. Lewis Dexter.

== Career ==
During the 1952–1953 academic year, Gorlin traveled to England as the Mosley Traveling Fellow from Harvard Medical School. There he joined the laboratory of Professor E. P. Sharpey-Schafer at St Thomas’ Hospital, London, and joined the weekly rounds of Dr. Paul Wood at the National Heart Hospital in London. Returning to Boston, he served as Chief Resident Physician in Medicine at the Brigham from 1953–1954.

Gorlin then enlisted in the U. S. Navy and was assigned to the United States Naval Hospital at Portsmouth, Virginia from 1954–1956. He was appointed the Officer in Charge of the Cardiopulmonary Laboratory where he worked closely with Dr. John Knowles. With Dr. Knowles, they researched pulmonary function and right heart catheterization and established the Valsalva maneuver as a test in patients with congestive heart failure and pulmonary congestion. They reported some of the earliest studies of the hemodynamics of aortic valve stenosis.

In 1956, Gorlin returned to the Brigham and faculty at Harvard Medical School where he established his own research laboratory and cardiology fellowship training program. He was the director of the Cardiovascular Unit (1967–74) and chief of the Cardiovascular Division (1969–1974) at the Brigham. He stayed until 1974 having developed an international reputation as a researcher, teacher, and clinician.

In 1974, he left Harvard and joined the Mount Sinai School of Medicine in New York City. He was the Murray M. Rosenberg Professor of Medicine and served as the Chairman of the Samuel Bronfman Department of Medicine. While at Mount Sinai, Gorlin added seventeen subspecialty divisions and helped plan the Guggenheim Pavilion (new patient care facility). In 1987, he began serving as the President of the Medical Board and Dean for Clinical Affairs. He was co-director of the cardiology fellowship program at Mount Sinai. Gorlin retired from the Chairmanship of Medicine at Mount Sinai on June 30, 1992, and assumed the position of Senior Vice President of Ambulatory Care Programs and the George Baehr Professor of Clinical Medicine.

== Contributions to medicine ==
Working with his engineer father, they developed the Gorlin formula, an indirect method for calculating the orifice area of cardiac valves or congenital heart chamber defects. This formula is used to study the severity of aortic valve stenosis and mitral valve stenosis.

Gorlin was a very early pioneer in the use of coronary angiography to evaluate coronary artery disease. He completed studies integrating the clinical findings in coronary artery disease with the anatomy, physiology, and metabolism of the disorder. His findings preceded by ten years the concept of hibernating myocardium.

Gorlin was one of the first to describe the relationship between diminished heart pumping function (left ventricle ejection fraction) and increased mortality. He was also one of the first to describe angina pectoris in patients without obstructive coronary artery disease, also now known as microvascular angina. In addition, he was one of the first to recognize that significant left main coronary artery disease was a dire prognostic factor. Gorlin played a dominant role in the DIG trial, the largest trial to evaluate digoxin in patients with chronic congestive heart failure.

He authored more than 400 published papers and over 100 invited articles, delivered 75 honorary lectures, served on the editorial boards of multiple journals, and was Editor-in-Chief of the journal Primary Cardiology for 20 years.

== Awards ==
Gorlin's major awards include:

- Lewis Conner Lectureship of the American Heart Association 1985
- Council on Clinical Cardiology Distinguished Achievement Award of the American Heart Association 1987
- Jacobi Medal of the Mount Sinai Hospital 1991
- Henry Russek Lectureship of the American College of Cardiology 1991
- James B. Herrick Award of the American Heart Association’s Council on Clinical Cardiology 1995
- J. Lester Gabrilove Award, for Significant Contributions to Medicine 1992

== Personal life and death ==
Gorlin's first marriage was to Marjorie Shore in 1960 and they had a daughter, Wendy, and sons Bill and Douglas. His second marriage was to Winifred Leifer in 1970. His third marriage in 1987 was to Florence Zuckerman and they remained married until his death.

Gorlin died at Mount Sinai Hospital in Manhattan on October 16, 1997, at 71 years of age due to pancreatic cancer.
