= Pulse =

Tactile arterial palpation of the heartbeat by fingertips

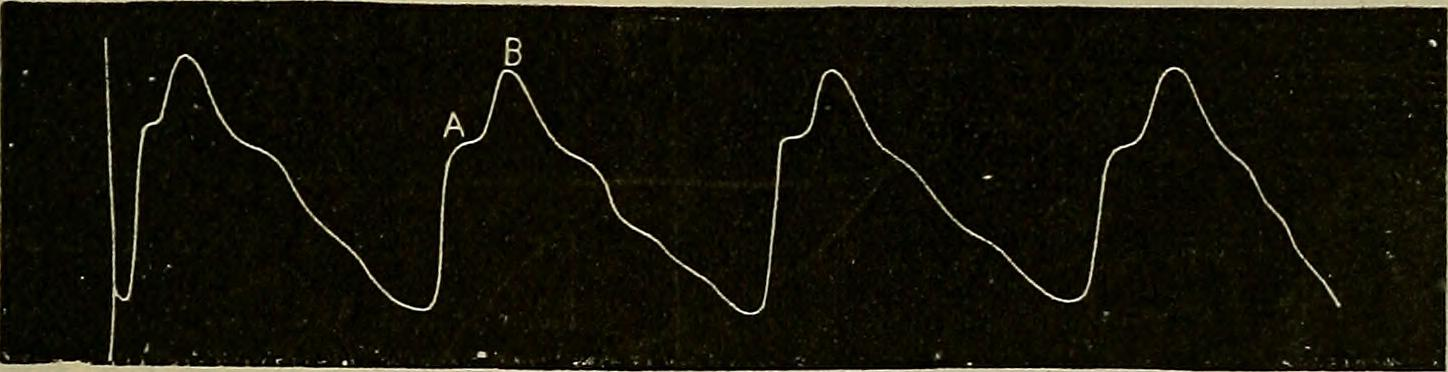
- Diagram of the rise and fall of blood pressure from a pulse
- Organisms: Animalia*
- Biological system: Circulatory system
- Action: Involuntary
- Method: Heart pumps blood using reciprocating method causing inconstant blood flow throughout the circulatory system that can be recognized. (See Cardiac cycle)
- Frequency: 60–100 per minute (humans)
- Duration: 0.6–1 second (humans)
- Animalia with the exception of Porifera, Cnidaria, Ctenophora, Platyhelminthes, Bryozoan, Amphioxus

In medicine, pulse is the rhythmic expansion and contraction of an artery in response to the cardiac cycle (heartbeat). The pulse may be felt (palpated) in any place that allows an artery to be compressed near the surface of the body, such as at the neck (carotid artery), wrist (radial artery or ulnar artery), at the groin (femoral artery), behind the knee (popliteal artery), near the ankle joint (posterior tibial artery), and on foot (dorsalis pedis artery). The pulse is most commonly measured at the wrist or neck for adults and at the brachial artery (inner upper arm between the shoulder and elbow) for infants and very young children. A sphygmograph is an instrument for measuring the pulse.

== Physiology ==
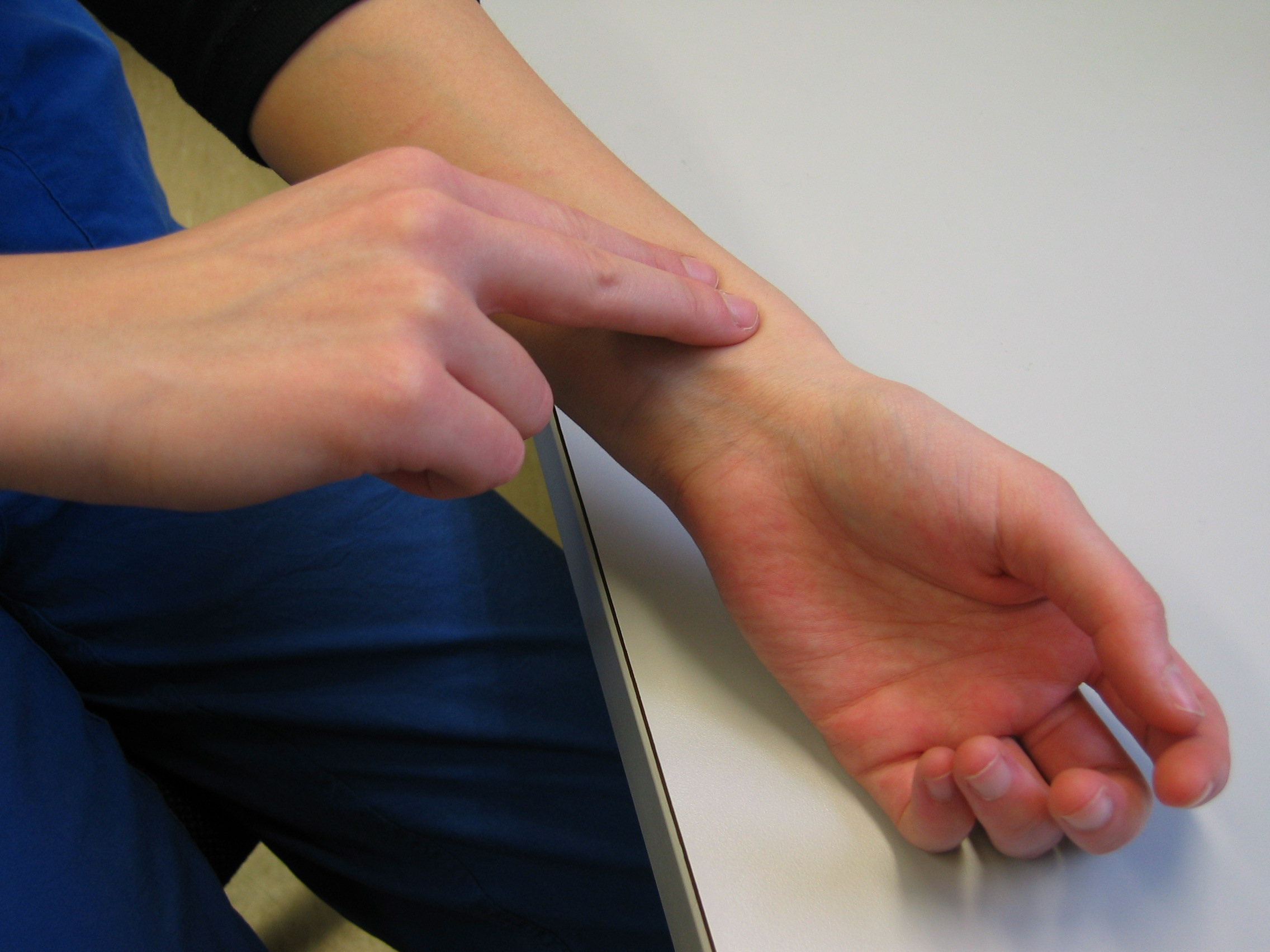
Pulse evaluation at the radial artery

Recommended points to evaluate pulse

Claudius Galen was perhaps the first physiologist to describe the pulse. The pulse is an expedient tactile method of determination of systolic blood pressure to a trained observer. Diastolic blood pressure is non-palpable and unobservable by tactile methods, occurring between heartbeats.

Pressure waves generated by the heart in systole move the arterial walls. Forward movement of blood occurs when the boundaries are pliable and compliant. These properties form enough to create a palpable pressure wave.

Pulse velocity, pulse deficits and much more physiologic data are readily and simplistically visualized by the use of one or more arterial catheters connected to a transducer and oscilloscope. This invasive technique has been commonly used in intensive care since the 1970s.

The pulse may be further indirectly observed under light absorbances of varying wavelengths with assigned and inexpensively reproduced mathematical ratios. Applied capture of variances of light signal from the blood component hemoglobin under oxygenated vs. deoxygenated conditions allows the technology of pulse oximetry.

== Characteristics ==
=== Rate ===
The rate of the pulse can be observed and measured on the outside of an artery by tactile or visual means. It is recorded as arterial beats per minute or BPM. Although the pulse and heart beat are related, they are not the same. For example, there is a delay between the onset of the heart beat and the onset of the pulse, known as the pulse transit time, which varies by site. Similarly measurements of heart rate variability and pulse rate variability differ.

In healthy people, the pulse rate is close to the heart rate, as measured by ECG. Measuring the pulse rate is therefore a convenient way to estimate the heart rate. Pulse deficit is a condition in which a person has a difference between their pulse rate and heart rate. It can be observed by simultaneous palpation at the radial artery and auscultation using a stethoscope at the PMI, near the heart apex, for example. Typically, in people with pulse deficit, heart beats do not result in pulsations at the periphery, meaning the pulse rate is lower than the heart rate. Pulse deficit has been found to be significant in the context of premature ventricular contraction and atrial fibrillation.

=== Rhythm ===
A normal pulse is regular in rhythm and force. An irregular pulse may be due to sinus arrhythmia, ectopic beats, atrial fibrillation, paroxysmal atrial tachycardia, atrial flutter, partial heart block etc. Intermittent dropping out of beats at pulse is called "intermittent pulse". Examples of regular intermittent (regularly irregular) pulse include pulsus bigeminus, second-degree atrioventricular block. An example of irregular intermittent (irregularly irregular) pulse is atrial fibrillation.

=== Volume ===
The degree of expansion displayed by artery during diastolic and systolic state is called volume. It is also known as amplitude, expansion or size of pulse.

==== Hypokinetic pulse ====
A weak pulse signifies narrow pulse pressure. It may be due to low cardiac output (as seen in shock, congestive cardiac failure), hypovolemia, valvular heart disease (such as aortic outflow tract obstruction, mitral stenosis, aortic arch syndrome) etc.

==== Hyperkinetic pulse ====
A bounding pulse signifies high pulse pressure. It may be due to low peripheral resistance (as seen in fever, anemia, thyrotoxicosis, hyperkinetic heart syndrome, A-V fistula, Paget's disease, beriberi, liver cirrhosis), increased cardiac output, increased stroke volume (as seen in anxiety, exercise, complete heart block, aortic regurgitation), decreased distensibility of arterial system (as seen in atherosclerosis, hypertension and coarctation of aorta).

The strength of the pulse can also be reported:

- 0 = Absent
- 1 = Barely palpable
- 2 = Easily palpable
- 3 = Full
- 4 = Aneurysmal or bounding pulse

=== Force ===
Also known as compressibility of pulse. It is a rough indication of systolic blood pressure.

=== Tension ===
Determined mainly by mean arterial blood pressure; corresponds to diastolic blood pressure. A low tension pulse (pulsus mollis), the vessel is soft or impalpable between beats. In high tension pulse (pulsus durus), vessels feel rigid even between pulse beats.

=== Form ===
A form or contour of a pulse is palpatory estimation of arteriogram. A quickly rising and quickly falling pulse (pulsus celer) is seen in aortic regurgitation. A slow rising and slowly falling pulse (pulsus tardus) is seen in aortic stenosis.

=== Equality ===
Comparing pulses and different places gives valuable clinical information.

A discrepant or unequal pulse between left and right radial artery is observed in anomalous or aberrant course of artery, coarctation of aorta, aortitis, dissecting aneurysm, peripheral embolism etc. An unequal pulse between upper and lower extremities is seen in coarctation to aorta, aortitis, block at bifurcation of aorta, dissection of aorta, iatrogenic trauma and arteriosclerotic obstruction.

=== Condition of arterial wall ===
A normal artery is not palpable after flattening by digital pressure. A thick radial artery which is palpable 7.5–10 cm up the forearm is suggestive of arteriosclerosis.

=== Radio-femoral delay ===
In coarctation of aorta, femoral pulse may be significantly delayed as compared to radial pulse (unless there is coexisting aortic regurgitation). The delay can also be observed in supravalvar aortic stenosis.

== Patterns ==
Several pulse patterns can be of clinical significance. These include:

- Anacrotic pulse: notch on the upstroke of the carotid pulse. Two distinct waves (slow initial upstroke and delayed peak, which is close to S2). Present in AS.
- Dicrotic pulse: is characterized by two beats per cardiac cycle, one systolic and the other diastolic. Physiologically, the dicrotic wave is the result of reflected waves from the lower extremities and aorta. Conditions associated with low cardiac output and high systemic vascular resistance can produce a dicrotic pulse.
- Pulse deficit: difference in the heart rate by direct cardiac ausculation and by palpation of the peripheral arterial pulse rate when in atrial fibrillation (AF).
- Pulsus alternans: an ominous medical sign that indicates progressive systolic heart failure. To trained fingertips, the examiner notes a pattern of a strong pulse followed by a weak pulse over and over again. This pulse signals a flagging effort of the heart to sustain itself in systole. It also can be detected in HCM with obstruction.
- Pulsus bigeminus: indicates a pair of hoofbeats within each heartbeat. Concurrent auscultation of the heart may reveal a gallop rhythm of the native heartbeat.
- Pulsus bisferiens: is characterized by two beats per cardiac cycle, both systolic, unlike the dicrotic pulse. It is an unusual physical finding typically seen in patients with aortic valve diseases if the aortic valve does not normally open and close. Trained fingertips will observe two pulses to each heartbeat instead of one.
- Pulsus tardus et parvus, also pulsus parvus et tardus, slow-rising pulse and anacrotic pulse, is weak (parvus), and late (tardus) relative to its expected characteristics. It is caused by a stiffened aortic valve that makes it progressively harder to open, thus requiring increased generation of blood pressure in the left ventricle. It is seen in aortic valve stenosis.
- Pulsus paradoxus: a condition in which some heartbeats cannot be detected at the radial artery during the inspiration phase of respiration. It is caused by an exaggerated decrease in blood pressure during this phase, and is diagnostic of a variety of cardiac and respiratory conditions of varying urgency, such as cardiac tamponade.
- Tachycardia: an elevated resting heart rate. In general an electrocardiogram (ECG) is required to identify the type of tachycardia.
- Pulsatile This description of the pulse implies the intrinsic physiology of systole and diastole. Scientifically, systole and diastole are forces that expand and contract the pulmonary and systemic circulations.
- A collapsing pulse is a sign of hyperdynamic circulation, which can be seen in AR or PDA.

== Common palpable sites ==
Sites can be divided into peripheral pulses and central pulses. Central pulses include the carotid and femoral pulses.

=== Upper limb ===
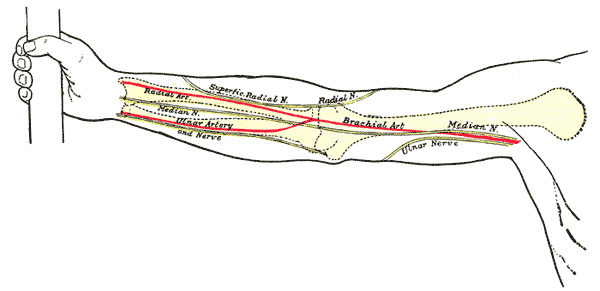
Front of right upper extremity

- Axillary pulse: located inferiorly of the lateral wall of the axilla
- Brachial pulse: located on the inside of the upper arm near the elbow, frequently used in place of carotid pulse in infants (brachial artery)
- Radial pulse: located on the lateral of the wrist (radial artery). It can also be found in the anatomical snuff box. Commonly, the radial pulse is measured with three fingers. The finger closest to the heart is used to occlude the pulse pressure, the middle finger is used get a crude estimate of the blood pressure, and the finger most distal to the heart (usually the ring finger) is used to nullify the effect of the ulnar pulse as the two arteries are connected via the palmar arches (superficial and deep).
- Ulnar pulse: located on the medial of the wrist (ulnar artery).

=== Lower limb ===
- Femoral pulse: located in the inner thigh, at the mid-inguinal point, halfway between the pubic symphysis and anterior superior iliac spine (femoral artery).
- Popliteal pulse: Above the knee in the popliteal fossa, found by holding the bent knee. The patient bends the knee at approximately 124°, and the health care provider holds it in both hands to find the popliteal artery in the pit behind the knee (popliteal artery).
- Dorsalis pedis pulse: located on top of the foot, immediately lateral to the extensor of hallucis longus (dorsalis pedis artery).
- Tibialis posterior pulse: located on the medial side of the ankle, 2 cm inferior and 2 cm posterior to the medial malleolus (posterior tibial artery). It is easily palpable over Pimenta's Point.

=== Head and neck ===
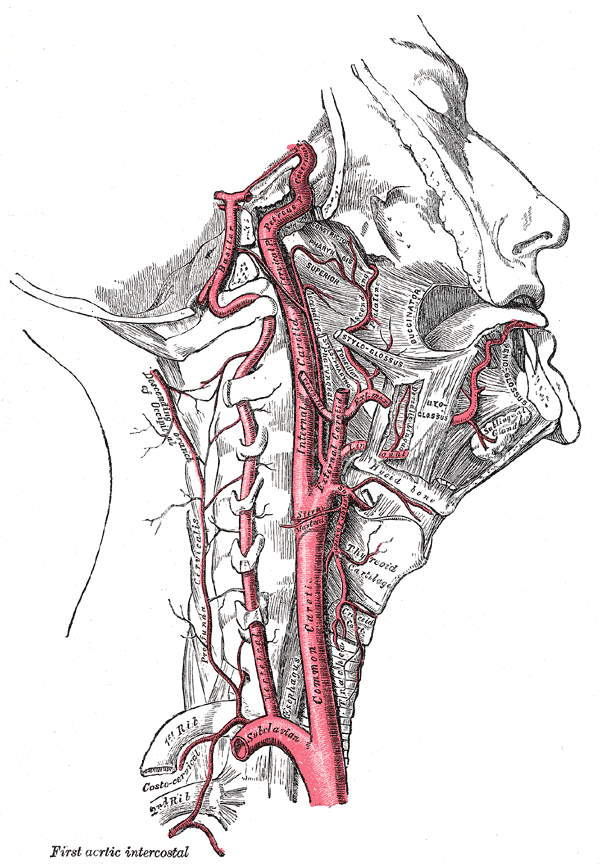
Arteries of the neck

- Carotid pulse: located in the neck (carotid artery). The carotid artery should be palpated gently and while the patient is sitting or lying down. Stimulating its baroreceptors with low palpitation can provoke severe bradycardia or even stop the heart in some sensitive persons. Also, a person's two carotid arteries should not be palpated at the same time. Doing so may limit the flow of blood to the head, possibly leading to fainting or brain ischemia. It can be felt between the anterior border of the sternocleidomastoid muscle, above the hyoid bone and lateral to the thyroid cartilage.
- Facial pulse: located on the mandible (lower jawbone) on a line with the corners of the mouth (facial artery).
- Temporal pulse: located on the temple directly in front of the ear (superficial temporal artery).

Although the pulse can be felt in multiple places in the head, people should not normally hear their heartbeats within the head. This is called pulsatile tinnitus, and it can indicate several medical disorders.

=== Torso ===
- Apical pulse: located in the 5th left intercostal space, 1.25 cm lateral to the mid-clavicular line. In contrast with other pulse sites, the apical pulse site is unilateral, and measured not under an artery, but below the heart itself (more specifically, the apex of the heart). See also apex beat.

== History ==
Pulse rate was first measured by ancient Greek physicians and scientists. The first person to measure the heart beat was Herophilus of Alexandria, Egypt (c. 335–280 BC) who designed a water clock to time the pulse. Rumi has mentioned in a poem that "The wise physician measured the patient's pulse and became aware of his condition." It shows the practice was common during Rumi's era and geography. The first person to accurately measure the pulse rate was Santorio Santorii who invented the pulsilogium, a form of pendulum which was later studied by Galileo Galilei. A century later another physician, de Lacroix, used the pulsilogium to test cardiac function.

== See also ==
- Pulse meter
- Tempo
- Pulse diagnosis – a practice in various types of traditional medicine
- Pulse pressure
