= Gorlin =

Gorlin may refer to:

== People ==
- Dan Gorlin, computer game programmer, designer and founder of Dan Gorlin Productions
- Eitan Gorlin, filmmaker, author and actor
- Mikhail Gorlin, Russian emigre poet
- Richard Gorlin, American cardiologist, co-developed the Gorlin equation
- Robert J. Gorlin, a professor and researcher at the University of Minnesota

== In medicine ==
- Gorlin sign, the ability to touch the tip of the nose with the tongue and touch the elbow with the tongue
- Gorlin syndrome, also known as basal cell nevus syndrome
- The Gorlin equation, a method to calculate the effective area of a heart valve during cardiac catheterization
