= Cardiac examination =

Medical inspection

In medicine, the cardiac examination, also precordial exam, is performed as part of a physical examination, or when a patient presents with chest pain suggestive of a cardiovascular pathology. It would typically be modified depending on the indication and integrated with other examinations especially the respiratory examination.

Like all medical examinations, the cardiac examination follows the standard structure of inspection, palpation and auscultation.

== Positioning ==
The patient is positioned in the supine position tilted up at 45 degrees if the patient can tolerate this. The head should rest on a pillow and the arms by their sides. The level of the jugular venous pressure (JVP) should only be commented on in this position as flatter or steeper angles lead to artificially elevated or reduced level respectively. Also, left ventricular failure leads to pulmonary edema which increases and may impede breathing if the patient is laid flat.

Lighting should be adjusted so that it is not obscured by the examiner who will approach from the right hand side of the patient as is medical custom.

The torso and neck should be fully exposed and access should be available to the legs.

== Inspection ==
General Inspection:

- Inspect the patient's status: whether the patient is comfortable at rest or obviously short of breath.
- Inspect the neck for increased jugular venous pressure (JVP) or abnormal waves.
- Any abnormal movements such as head bobbing.
- There are specific signs associated with cardiac illness and abnormality however, during inspection any noticed cutaneous sign are usually noted.

Inspect the hands for:

- Temperature – described as warm or cool, clammy or dry
- Skin turgor for hydration
- Janeway lesion
- Osler's node
- At the nails Splinter hemorrhage and Quincke's pulsation should be looked for as well as any deformity of the nail such as Beau's lines, clubbing or peripheral cyanosis.

Inspect the head for:

- Cheeks for the malar flush of mitral stenosis.
- The eyes for corneal arcus and surrounding tissue for xanthalasma.
- Conjunctiva pallor a sign of anemia.
- The mouth for hygiene.
- The mucosa for hydration and pallor or central cyanosis.
- The ear lobes for Frank's sign.

Then inspect the precordium for:

- visible pulsations
- apex beat
- masses
- scars
- lesions
- signs of trauma and previous surgery (e.g. median sternotomy)
- any signs of previously-implanted cardiac hardware such as pacemakers or implanted cardiac defibrillators
- precordial bulge

== Palpation ==
The pulses should be palpated, first the radial pulse commenting on rate and rhythm then the brachial pulse commenting on character and finally the carotid pulse again for character. The pulses may be:

- Bounding as in large pulse pressure found in aortic regurgitation or CO_{2} retention.
- And the rhythm should be assessed as regular, regularly irregular or irregularly irregular.
- Consistency of the strength to assess for Pulsus alternans.
- Slow rising as found in aortic stenosis known as parvus et tardus
- Jerky as found in HOCM
- Pulses can also be auscultated for features like Traube's pistol shot femoral pulse.

=== Palpation of the precordium ===
The valve areas are palpated for abnormal pulsations (palpable heart murmurs known as thrills) and precordial movements (known as heaves). Heaves are best felt with the heel of the hand at the sternal border.

=== Palpation of the apex beat ===
The apex beat is found approximately in the fifth left intercostal space in the mid-clavicular line. It can be impalpable for a variety of reasons including obesity, emphysema, effusion and rarely dextrocardia. The apex beat is assessed for size, amplitude, location, impulse and duration. There are specific terms to describe the sensation such as tapping, heaving and thrusting.

Often the apex beat is felt diffusely over a large area, in this case the most inferior and lateral position it can be felt in should be described as well as the location of the largest amplitude.

Finally the sacrum and ankles are checked for pitting edema which is caused by right ventricular failure in isolation or as part of congestive cardiac failure.

== Auscultation ==
One should comment on

- S1 and S2 – if the splitting is abnormal or louder than usual.
- S3 – the emphasis and timing of the syllables in the word Kentucky is similar to the pattern of sounds in a precordial S3.
- S4 – the emphasis and timing of the syllables in the word Tennessee is similar to the pattern of sounds in a precordial S4.
- If S4 S1 S2 S3 Also known as a gallop rhythm.
- diastolic murmurs (e.g. aortic regurgitation, mitral stenosis)
- systolic murmurs (e.g. aortic stenosis, mitral regurgitation)
- pericardial rub (suggestive of pericarditis)
- The base of the lungs should be auscultated for signs of pulmonary oedema due to a cardiac cause such as bilateral basal crepitations.

== Completion of examination ==
To complete the exam blood pressure should be checked, an ECG recorded, funduscopy performed to assess for Roth spots or papilledema. A full peripheral circulation exam should be performed.

== See also ==
- Heart sounds
- Physical examination
- Precordial thump
