= Aortic stenosis =

Narrowing of the exit of the heart's left ventricle

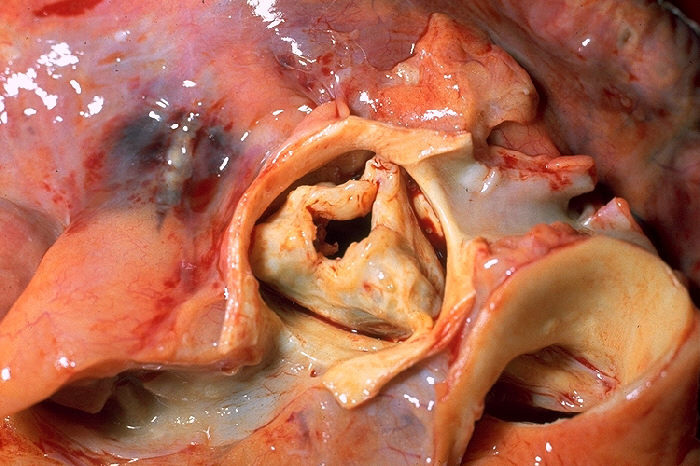
- In the center an aortic valve with severe stenosis due to rheumatic heart disease. The valve is surrounded by the aorta. The pulmonary trunk is at the upper right. The right coronary artery, cut lengthwise, is at the lower left. The left main coronary artery, also cut lengthwise, is on the right.
- Specialty: Cardiothoracic surgery
- Symptoms: Decreased ability to exercise, loss of consciousness, shortness of breath, heart related chest pain, leg swelling
- Complications: Heart failure
- Usual onset: Gradual
- Causes: Bicuspid aortic valve, rheumatic fever
- Risk factors: Smoking, high blood pressure, high cholesterol, diabetes, being male
- Diagnostic method: Ultrasound of the heart
- Treatment: Aortic valve replacement, balloon aortic valvuloplasty
- Prognosis: Five-year survival ~50% without treatment in symptomatic patients
- Frequency: 2% of people over 65 (developed world)

Aortic stenosis (AS or AoS) is the narrowing of the outlet of the main pumping chamber of the heart, the left ventricle (LV) (where the aorta begins). If the narrowing is severe (very tight) the extra work required from the left ventricle to pump the blood against the increased resistance of a small orifice may cause (initially adaptive) thickening of the heart muscle, followed by severe weakness of the heart (heart failure). The most common form of AS involves the aortic valve, which separates the LV from the aorta. Much more rarely stenosis can occur below the aortic valve or above it. Aortic stenosis typically gets worse over time. Typical symptoms are shortness of breath on exertion, chest pain (angina) and dizziness or blackouts on exertion (syncope). They often come on gradually, with a decreased ability to exercise often occurring first. If heart failure, loss of consciousness, or heart related chest pain occur due to AS, the outcomes are worse, with mortality of 50% at 2-5 years in the absence of valve replacement. Loss of consciousness typically occurs with standing or exercising. Signs of heart failure include shortness of breath especially when lying down, at night, or with exercise, and swelling of the legs. Thickening of the aortic valve without obstruction to flow is known as aortic sclerosis.

Causes include being born with a bicuspid aortic valve, and rheumatic fever; a normal valve may also harden over the decades due to calcification. A bicuspid aortic valve affects about one to two percent of the population. As of 2014 rheumatic heart disease mostly occurs in the developing world. Risk factors are similar to those of coronary artery disease and include smoking, high blood pressure, high cholesterol, diabetes, and being male. The aortic valve usually has three leaflets and is located between the left ventricle of the heart and the aorta. AS typically results in a heart murmur. Its severity can be divided into mild, moderate, severe, and very severe, distinguishable by ultrasound scan of the heart.

Aortic stenosis is typically followed up with repeated ultrasound scans. Once it has become severe, treatment primarily involves valve replacement surgery, with transcatheter aortic valve replacement (TAVR) being an option in some who are at high risk from surgery. Valves may either be mechanical or bioprosthetic, with each having risks and benefits. Another less invasive procedure, balloon aortic valvuloplasty (BAV), may result in benefit, but for only a few months. Complications such as heart failure may be treated in the same way as in those with mild to moderate AS. In those with severe disease several medications should be avoided, including ACE inhibitors, nitroglycerin, and some beta blockers. Nitroprusside or phenylephrine may be used in those with decompensated heart failure depending on the blood pressure.

Aortic stenosis is the most common valvular heart disease in the developed world. It affects about 2% of people who are over 65 years of age. Estimated rates were not known in most of the developing world as of 2014. In those who have symptoms, without repair the chance of death at five years is about 50% and at 10 years is about 90%. Aortic stenosis was first described by French physician Lazare Rivière in 1663.

== Signs and symptoms ==
Symptoms related to aortic stenosis depend on the degree of stenosis. Most people with mild to moderate aortic stenosis do not have symptoms. Symptoms are usually present in individuals with severe aortic stenosis, though they may also occur in those with mild to moderate aortic stenosis. The three main symptoms of aortic stenosis are loss of consciousness, anginal chest pain and shortness of breath with activity or other symptoms of heart failure such as shortness of breath while lying flat, episodes of shortness of breath at night, or swollen legs and feet. It may also be accompanied by the characteristic "Dresden china" appearance of pallor with a light flush.

=== Angina ===
Angina in the setting of heart failure also increases the risk of death. In people with angina, the 5-year mortality rate is 50% if the aortic valve is not replaced.

Angina in the setting of AS occurs due to left ventricular hypertrophy (LVH) that is caused by the constant production of increased pressure required to overcome the pressure gradient caused by the AS. While the muscular layer of the left ventricle thickens, the arteries that supply the muscle do not get significantly longer or bigger, so the muscle may not receive enough blood supply to meet its oxygen requirement. This ischemia may first be evident during exercise when the heart muscle requires increased blood supply to compensate for the increased workload. The individual may complain of anginal chest pain with exertion. Exercise stress testing with or without imaging is strictly contraindicated in symptomatic patients with severe aortic stenosis. Exercise stress test is now recommended by current guidelines in asymptomatic patients and may provide incremental prognostic value.

Eventually, however, the heart muscle will require more blood supply at rest than can be supplied by the coronary artery branches. At this point there may be signs of ventricular strain pattern (ST segment depression and T wave inversion) on the EKG, suggesting subendocardial ischemia. The subendocardium is the region that is most susceptible to ischemia because it is the most distant from the epicardial coronary arteries.

=== Syncope ===
Syncope (fainting spells) from aortic valve stenosis is usually exertional. In the setting of heart failure it increases the risk of death. In people with syncope, the three-year mortality rate is 50% if the aortic valve is not replaced.

It is unclear why aortic stenosis causes syncope. One theory is that severe AS produces a nearly fixed cardiac output. When a person with aortic stenosis exercises, their peripheral vascular resistance will decrease as the blood vessels of the skeletal muscles dilate to allow the muscles to receive more blood to allow them to do more work. This decrease in peripheral vascular resistance is normally compensated for by an increase in the cardiac output. Since people with severe AS cannot increase their cardiac output, the blood pressure falls and the person will faint due to decreased blood perfusion to the brain.

A second theory is that during exercise, the high pressures generated in the hypertrophied left ventricle cause a vasodepressor response, which causes a secondary peripheral vasodilation that, in turn, causes decreased blood flow to the brain, resulting in loss of consciousness. Indeed, in aortic stenosis, because of the fixed obstruction to blood flow out from the heart, it may be impossible for the heart to increase its output to offset peripheral vasodilation.

A third mechanism may sometimes be operative. Due to the hypertrophy of the left ventricle in aortic stenosis, including the consequent inability of the coronary arteries to adequately supply blood to the myocardium (see "Angina" below), abnormal heart rhythms may develop. These can lead to syncope.

Finally, in calcific aortic stenosis at least, the calcification in and around the aortic valve can progress and extend to involve the electrical conduction system of the heart. If that occurs, the result may be heart block, a potentially lethal condition of which syncope may be a symptom.

=== Congestive heart failure ===
Congestive heart failure (CHF) carries a grave prognosis in people with AS. People with CHF attributable to AS have a 2-year mortality rate of 50% if the aortic valve is not replaced. CHF in the setting of AS is due to a combination of left ventricular hypertrophy with fibrosis, systolic dysfunction (a decrease in the ejection fraction) and diastolic dysfunction (elevated filling pressure of the LV).

=== Associated symptoms ===
In Heyde's syndrome, aortic stenosis is associated with gastrointestinal bleeding due to angiodysplasia of the colon. Recent research has shown that the stenosis causes a form of von Willebrand disease by breaking down its associated coagulation factor (factor VIII-associated antigen, also called von Willebrand factor), due to increased turbulence around the stenotic valve.

=== Complications ===
Notwithstanding the foregoing, the American Heart Association changed its recommendations regarding antibiotic prophylaxis for endocarditis. Specifically, as of 2007, it is recommended that such prophylaxis should be limited only to those with prosthetic heart valves, those with previous episode(s) of endocarditis, and those with certain types of congenital heart disease.

Since the stenosed aortic valve may limit the heart's output, people with aortic stenosis are at risk of syncope and dangerously low blood pressure should they use any of a number of medications for cardiovascular diseases that often coexist with aortic stenosis. Examples include nitroglycerin, nitrates, ACE inhibitors, terazosin (Hytrin), and hydralazine. Note that all of these substances lead to peripheral vasodilation. Under normal circumstances, in the absence of aortic stenosis, the heart is able to increase its output and thereby offset the effect of the dilated blood vessels. In some cases of aortic stenosis, however, due to the obstruction of blood flow out of the heart caused by the stenosed aortic valve, cardiac output cannot be increased. Low blood pressure or syncope may ensue.

== Causes ==
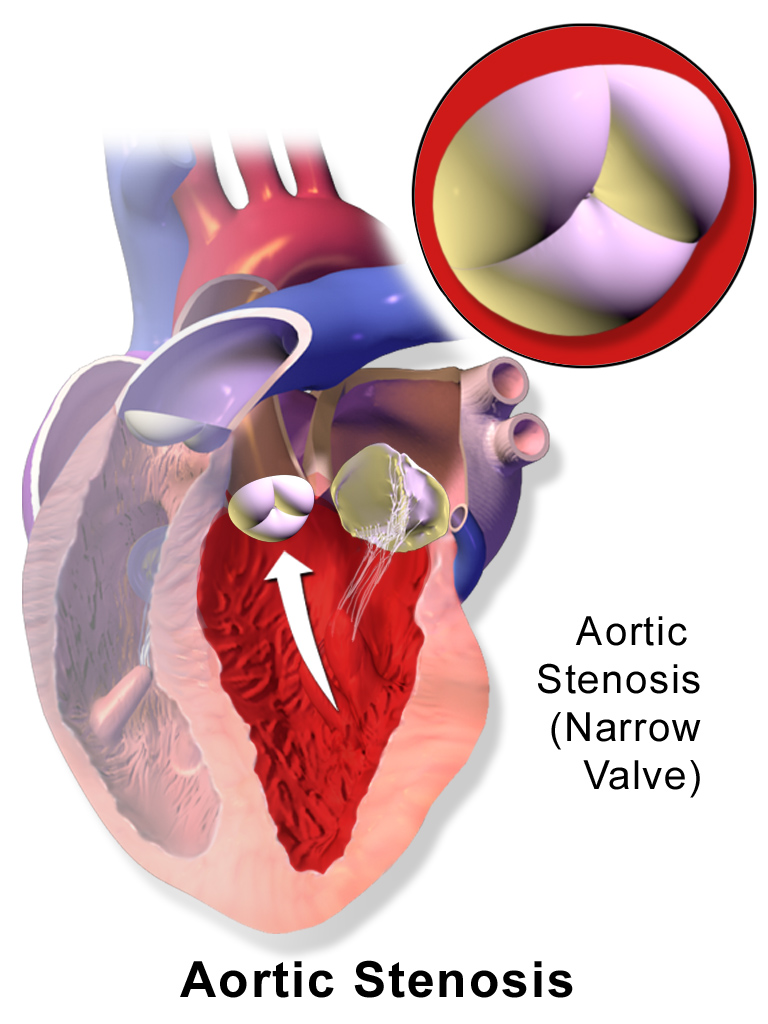
Illustration depicting aortic stenosis

Aortic stenosis is most commonly caused by age-related progressive calcific aortic valve disease (CAVD) (>50% of cases), with a mean age of 65 to 70 years. CAVD is the build-up of calcium on the cusps of the valve, and this calcification causes hardening and stenosis of the valve. Another major cause of aortic stenosis is the calcification of a congenital bicuspid aortic valve or, more rarely, a congenital unicuspid aortic valve. Those with unicuspid aortic valves typically need intervention when very young, often as a newborn, while those with congenital bicuspid aortic valve make up 30-40% of those presenting during adulthood and typically present earlier (ages 40+ to 50+) than those with tricuspid aortic valves (65+).

Acute rheumatic fever post-inflammatory is the cause of less than 10% of cases. Rare causes of aortic stenosis include Fabry disease, systemic lupus erythematosus, Paget disease, high blood uric acid levels, and infection.

== Pathophysiology ==
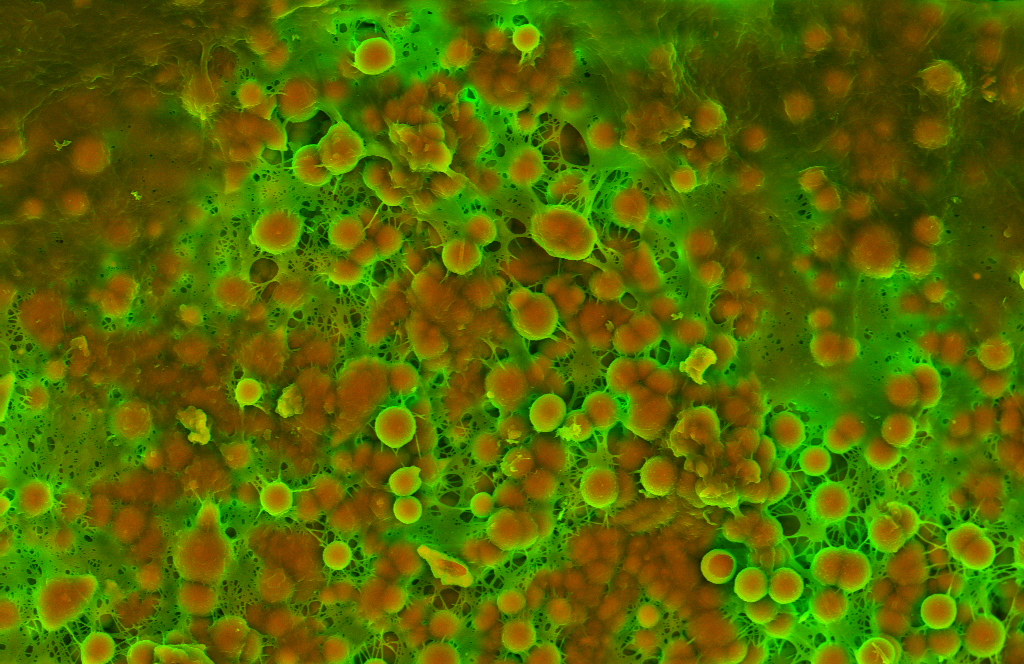
Density-dependent colour scanning electron micrograph of cardiovascular calcification, showing in orange calcium phosphate spherical particles (denser material) and, in green, the extracellular matrix (less dense material).

The human aortic valve normally consists of three cusps or leaflets and has an opening of 3.0-4.0 square centimeters. When the left ventricle contracts, it forces blood through the valve into the aorta and subsequently to the rest of the body. When the left ventricle expands again, the aortic valve closes and prevents the blood in the aorta from flowing backward (regurgitation) into the left ventricle. In aortic stenosis, the opening of the aortic valve becomes narrowed or constricted (stenotic) (e.g., due to calcification). Degenerative (the most common variety) and bicuspid aortic stenosis both begin with damage to endothelial cells from increased mechanical stress. Inflammation is thought to be involved in the earlier stages of the pathogenesis of AS and its associated risk factors are known to promote the deposition of LDL cholesterol and lipoprotein(a), a highly damaging substance, into the aortic valve, causing significant damage and stenosis over time. Infiltration of inflammatory cells (macrophages, T lymphocytes), followed by the release of inflammatory mediators such as interleukin-1-beta and transforming growth factor beta-1 occurs. Subsequently, fibroblasts differentiate into osteoblast-like cells, which results in abnormal bone matrix deposition leading to progressive valvular calcification and stenosis.

As a consequence of this stenosis, the left ventricle must generate a higher pressure with each contraction to effectively move blood forward into the aorta. Initially, the LV generates this increased pressure by thickening its muscular walls (myocardial hypertrophy). The type of hypertrophy most commonly seen in AS is known as concentric hypertrophy, in which the walls of the LV are (approximately) equally thickened.

In the later stages, the left ventricle dilates, the wall thins, and the systolic function deteriorates (resulting in impaired ability to pump blood forward). Morris and Innasimuthu et al. showed that different coronary anatomy is associated with different valve diseases. Research was in progress in 2010 to see if different coronary anatomy might lead to turbulent flow at the level of valves, leading to inflammation and degeneration.

=== Degenerative Disease ===
Degenerative aortic valve stenosis represents the most common etiology of aortic stenosis (AS), particularly among elderly populations in industrialized nations. The pathophysiology involves fibrotic and calcific remodeling of the valve, characterized by excess collagen deposition and disorganization. Transforming growth factor-β (TGF-β) plays a crucial role in this process by stimulating extracellular matrix formation. The prevalence of degenerative AS has significantly increased due to population aging, making it the most frequent cause of heart valve replacement in developed countries. Valve interstitial cells (VICs) undergo osteogenic differentiation (changing their cell types into bone-forming osteoblasts), facilitated by factors including hemodynamic stress, reactive oxygen species, and inflammatory cytokines, leading to progressive calcification of the valve tissue.

=== Congenital Valve Defects ===
Bicuspid aortic valve represents the most common congenital valve defect causing AS, with a prevalence of approximately 0.5-1% in children. Patients with bicuspid valves typically develop degenerative AS earlier than those with tricuspid valves. The abnormal valve architecture alters hemodynamic stress patterns across the valve surface, accelerating degenerative processes. These patients often develop symptomatic disease at younger ages compared to those with trileaflet valves affected by age-related degenerative processes.

=== Rheumatic Heart Disease ===
Rheumatic heart disease, a systemic inflammatory condition resulting from untreated group A streptococcal infection, historically represented a significant cause of AS. However, its prevalence has markedly decreased in developed nations due to improved antibiotic availability. The pathophysiology involves immune-mediated damage to the valve tissue following streptococcal infection, resulting in scarring, commissural fusion, and subsequent calcification.

=== Lipid-Mediated Mechanisms ===
Lipid accumulation in aortic valves contributes significantly to valvular calcification by promoting osteogenic differentiation of VICs. Oxidized lipids mediate this process via bone morphogenetic protein-2 (BMP2) induction, which upregulates osteogenic pathways involving transcription factors such as msh homeobox 2 (Msx2) and Runx2/Cbfa1. The Wnt signaling pathway, activated by the low-density lipoprotein receptor protein-5 (LRP5), is overexpressed in stenotic aortic valves and drives osteogenic differentiation. This lipid-mediated calcification shares many features with atherosclerosis, including oxidative stress patterns that generate reactive oxygen species that further promote BMP2 expression and osteogenic programming.

=== Inflammation and Immune Activation ===
Inflammatory processes significantly contribute to AS development through multiple pathways. Oxidized lipids activate innate immune responses via toll-like receptors (TLRs) and the nuclear factor-κB (NF-κB) pathway, promoting osteogenic phenotypes in VICs. Interleukin-6 (IL-6), which is increased in calcified aortic valves, promotes mineralization of valve leaflets through BMP2 expression and induces receptor activator of NF-κB ligand (RANKL), further stimulating extracellular matrix production by VICs. This inflammatory cascade creates a self-perpetuating cycle that accelerates valve calcification and stenosis progression.

== Diagnosis ==
Phonocardiograms from normal and abnormal heart sounds

Simultaneous left ventricular and aortic pressure tracings to demonstrate a pressure gradient between the left ventricle and aorta, suggesting aortic stenosis. The left ventricle generates higher pressures than what is transmitted to the aorta. The pressure gradient, caused by aortic stenosis, is represented by the green shaded area. (AO = ascending aorta; LV = left ventricle; ECG = electrocardiogram.)

=== Palpation ===
Aortic stenosis is most often diagnosed when it is asymptomatic and can sometimes be detected during routine examination of the heart and circulatory system. Good evidence exists to demonstrate that certain characteristics of the peripheral pulse can rule in the diagnosis. In particular, there may be a slow and/or sustained upstroke of the arterial pulse, and the pulse may be of low volume. This is sometimes referred to as pulsus parvus et tardus. There may also be a noticeable delay between the first heart sound (on auscultation) and the corresponding pulse in the carotid artery ('apical-carotid delay'). In a similar manner, there may be a delay between the appearance of each pulse in the brachial artery (in the arm) and the radial artery (in the wrist).

=== Auscultation ===
The first heart sound may be followed by a sharp ejection sound ("ejection click") best heard at the lower left sternal border and the apex, and thus, appears to be "split". The ejection sound, caused by the impact of left ventricular outflow against the partially fused aortic valve leaflets, is more commonly associated with a mobile bicuspid aortic valve than an immobile calcified aortic valve. The intensity of this sound does not vary with respiration, which helps distinguish it from the ejection click produced by a stenotic pulmonary valve, which will diminish slightly in intensity during inspiration.

An easily heard systolic, crescendo-decrescendo (i.e., 'ejection') murmur is heard loudest at the upper right sternal border, at the 2nd right intercostal space, and radiates to the carotid arteries bilaterally. The murmur increases with squatting and decreases with standing and isometric muscular contraction such as the Valsalva maneuver, which helps distinguish it from hypertrophic obstructive cardiomyopathy (HOCM). The murmur is louder during expiration but is also easily heard during inspiration. The more severe the degree of the stenosis, the later the peak occurs in the crescendo-decrescendo of the murmur.

The second heart sound (A_{2}) tends to become decreased and softer as the aortic stenosis becomes more severe. This is a result of the increasing calcification of the valve, preventing it from "snapping" shut and producing a sharp, loud sound. Due to increases in left ventricular pressure from the stenotic aortic valve, over time, the ventricle may hypertrophy, resulting in diastolic dysfunction. As a result, there may be a fourth heart sound due to the stiff ventricle. With continued increases in ventricular pressure, dilatation of the ventricle will occur, and a third heart sound may be manifest.

Finally, aortic stenosis often co-exists with some degree of aortic insufficiency (aortic regurgitation). Hence, the physical exam in aortic stenosis may also reveal signs of the latter, for example, an early diastolic decrescendo murmur. Indeed, when both valve abnormalities are present, the expected findings of either may be modified or may not even be present. Rather, new signs that reflect the presence of simultaneous aortic stenosis and insufficiency, e.g., pulsus bisferiens, emerge.

According to a meta-analysis, the most useful findings for ruling in aortic stenosis in the clinical setting were slow rate of rise of the carotid pulse (positive likelihood ratio ranged 2.8–130 across studies), mid to late peak intensity of the murmur (positive likelihood ratio, 8.0–101), and decreased intensity of the second heart sound (positive likelihood ratio, 3.1–50).

Other peripheral signs include:

- sustained, heaving apex beat, which is not displaced unless systolic dysfunction of the left ventricle has developed
- A precordial thrill
- narrowed pulse pressure

=== Blood tests ===
For asymptomatic severe aortic valve stenosis, the European guidelines recommend B-type natriuretic peptide (BNP) measurements to aid risk stratification and optimize the timing of aortic valve replacement surgery. In patients with non-severe asymptomatic aortic valve stenosis, increased age- and sex adjusted N-terminal pro-brain natriuretic peptide (NT-proBNP) levels alone and combined with a 50% or greater increase from baseline had been found associated with increased event rates of aortic valve stenosis related events (cardiovascular death, hospitalization with heart failure due to progression of aortic valve stenosis, or aortic valve replacement surgery). In patients with non-severe asymptomatic aortic valve stenosis and no overt coronary artery disease, the increased troponin T (above 14 pg/mL) was found associated with an increased 5-year event rate of ischemic cardiac events (myocardial infarction, percutaneous coronary intervention, or coronary artery bypass surgery).

=== Electrocardiogram ===
Although aortic stenosis does not lead to any specific findings on the electrocardiogram (ECG), it still often leads to a number of electrocardiographic abnormalities. ECG manifestations of left ventricular hypertrophy (LVH) are common in aortic stenosis and arise as a result of the stenosis having placed a chronically high-pressure load on the left ventricle (with LVH being the expected response to chronic pressure loads on the left ventricle no matter what the cause).

As noted above, the calcification process that occurs in aortic stenosis can progress to extend beyond the aortic valve and into the electrical conduction system of the heart. Evidence of this phenomenon may rarely include ECG patterns characteristic of certain types of heart block, such as Left bundle branch block.

=== Heart catheterization ===
Cardiac chamber catheterization provides a definitive diagnosis, indicating severe stenosis in the valve area of <1.0 cm^{2} (normally about 3 cm^{2}). It can directly measure the pressure on both sides of the aortic valve. The pressure gradient may be used as a decision point for treatment. It is useful in symptomatic people before surgery. The standard for diagnosis of aortic stenosis is non-invasive testing with echocardiography. Cardiac catheterization is reserved for cases in which there is a discrepancy between the clinical picture and non-invasive testing, due to risks inherent to crossing the aortic valve, such as stroke.

=== Echocardiogram ===
Severity of aortic stenosis
Degree	Mean gradient (mmHg)	Aortic valve area (cm^{2})
Mild	<25	>1.5
Moderate	25 - 40	1.0 - 1.5
Severe	>40	< 1.0
Very severe	>70	< 0.6

Echocardiogram (heart ultrasound) is the best non-invasive way to evaluate the aortic valve anatomy and function.

The aortic valve area can be calculated non-invasively using echocardiographic flow velocities. Using the velocity of the blood through the valve, the pressure gradient across the valve can be calculated by the continuity equation or using the modified Bernoulli's equation:

Gradient = 4(velocity)² mmHg

A normal aortic valve has a gradient of only a few mmHg. A decreased valvular area causes an increased pressure gradient, and these parameters are used to classify and grade the aortic stenosis as mild, moderate, or severe. The pressure gradient can be abnormally low in the presence of mitral stenosis, heart failure, co-existent aortic regurgitation, and also ischaemic heart disease (disease related to the decreased blood supply and oxygen causing ischemia).

Echocardiogram may also show left ventricular hypertrophy, a thickened and immobile aortic valve, and dilated aortic root. However, it may appear deceptively normal in acute cases.

=== Chest X-ray ===
A chest X-ray can also assist in the diagnosis and provide clues as to the severity of the disease, showing the degree of calcification of the valve, and in a chronic condition, an enlarged left ventricle and atrium.

=== Computer tomography ===
The use of CT calcium scoring is gaining popularity as a diagnostic tool to complement echo in the assessment of patients with aortic stenosis. Aortic valve calcium scoring by multidetector computed tomography (CT-AVC) is used to quantify the degree of calcification of the aortic valve. According to the 2021 ESC/EACTS Guidelines for the management of valvular heart disease the recommended thresholds indicating severe aortic stenosis are > 1200 AU in women and > 2000 AU in men.

== Management ==
Treatment is generally not necessary in people without symptoms. In moderate cases echocardiography is performed every 1–2 years to monitor the progression, possibly complemented with a cardiac stress test. In severe cases, echocardiography is performed every 3–6 months. In both moderate and mild cases, the person should immediately make a revisit or be admitted for inpatient care if any new related symptoms appear. There are no therapeutic options currently available to treat people with aortic valve stenosis; however, studies in 2014 indicated that the disease occurs as a result of active cellular processes, suggesting that targeting these processes may lead to viable therapeutic approaches.

=== Medication ===
Observational studies demonstrated an association between lowered cholesterol with statins and decreased progression, but a randomized clinical trial published in 2005 failed to find any effect on calcific aortic stenosis. The effect of statins on the progression of AS is unclear. A 2007 study found a slowing of aortic stenosis with rosuvastatin. In 2013, it was reported that trials did not show any benefit in slowing AS progression, but did demonstrate a decrease in ischemic cardiovascular events.

In general, medical therapy has relatively poor efficacy in treating aortic stenosis. However, it may be useful to manage commonly coexisting conditions that correlate with aortic stenosis:

- Any angina is generally treated with beta-blockers and/or calcium blockers. Nitrates are contraindicated due to their potential to cause profound hypotension in aortic stenosis.
- Any hypertension is treated aggressively, but caution must be taken in administering beta-blockers. The optimal blood pressure in patients with asymptomatic aortic stenosis and no manifest atherosclerotic disease or diabetes mellitus was found to be a systolic blood pressure of 130-139 mmHg and a diastolic blood pressure of 70-90 mmHg.
- Any heart failure is generally treated with digoxin and diuretics, and, if not contraindicated, cautious administration of ACE inhibitors.

=== Aortic valve repair ===
Aortic valve repair or aortic valve reconstruction describes the reconstruction of both form and function of the native and dysfunctional aortic valve. Most frequently, it is applied for the treatment of aortic regurgitation. It can also become necessary for the treatment of an aortic aneurysm, less frequently for congenital aortic stenosis.

=== Aortic valve replacement ===
In adults, symptomatic severe aortic stenosis usually requires aortic valve replacement (AVR). While Surgical AVR has remained the most effective treatment for this disease process and is currently recommended for patients after the onset of symptoms, as of 2016 aortic valve replacement approaches included open-heart surgery, minimally invasive cardiac surgery (MICS), and minimally invasive catheter-based (percutaneous) aortic valve replacement. However, surgical aortic valve replacement is well-studied, and generally has a good and well-established longer-term prognosis.

A diseased aortic valve is most commonly replaced using a surgical procedure with either a mechanical or a tissue valve. The procedure is done either in an open-heart surgical procedure or, in a smaller but growing number of cases, a minimally invasive cardiac surgery (MICS) procedure. Minimally invasive approach via right minithoracotomy is most beneficial in the high risk patient such as the elderly, the obese, those with chronic obstructive pulmonary, chronic kidney disease and those requiring re-operative surgery.

=== Transcatheter aortic valve replacement ===
Globally, more than 250,000 people have received transcatheter aortic valve intervention (TAVI). For people who are not candidates for surgical valve replacement and most patients who are older than 75, TAVI may be a suitable alternative. Conduction abnormalities requiring permanent pacemaker (PPM) implantation remain a common finding after TAVI due to the proximity of the atrioventricular conduction system to the aortic root.

=== Balloon valvuloplasty ===
For infants and children, balloon valvuloplasty, where a balloon is inflated to stretch the valve and allow greater flow, may also be effective. In adults, however, it is generally ineffective, as the valve tends to return to a stenosed state. The surgeon will make a small incision at the top of the person's leg and proceed to insert the balloon into the artery. The balloon is then advanced up to the valve and is inflated to stretch the valve open.

=== Heart failure ===
Acute decompensated heart failure due to AS may be temporarily managed by an intra-aortic balloon pump while pending surgery. In those with high blood pressure nitroprusside may be carefully used. Phenylephrine may be used in those with very low blood pressure.

== Prognosis ==
If untreated, severe symptomatic aortic stenosis carries a poor prognosis, with a 2-year mortality rate of 50-60% and a 3-year survival rate of less than 30%. Prognosis after aortic valve replacement for people younger than 65 is about five years less than that of the general population; for people older than 65, it is about the same.

== Epidemiology ==
Approximately 2% of people over the age of 65, 3% of people over age 75, and 4% of people over age 85 have aortic valve stenosis. The prevalence is increasing with the aging population in North America and Europe.

Median age at diagnosis of aortic stenosis is 77 years in men and 81 years in women. Age-sex standardised incidence rates of aortic stenosis range from 52 (severe aortic stenosis) to 98 per 100 000 person-years in recent US and EU cohorts,and is about 30% higher in men compared to women.

Risk factors known to influence disease progression of AS include factors similar to those of coronary artery disease such as hypertension, advanced age, being male, hyperlipidemia, diabetes mellitus, cigarette smoking, metabolic syndrome, and end-stage kidney disease.

== History ==
Aortic stenosis was first described by French physician Lazare Rivière in 1663.

== Research ==
People on bisphosphonates were found in a 2010 study to have less progression of aortic stenosis, and some regressed. This finding led to multiple trials, ongoing as of 2012. Subsequent research failed to confirm the initial positive result.
