= Heart valve repair =

Surgical technique used to fix defects in heart valves

- Specialty: Cardiac surgery
- ICD-9-CM: 35.0-35.2

Heart valve repair is a cardiac surgery procedure, carried out to repair one or more faulty heart valves. In some valvular heart diseases repair where possible is preferable to valve replacement. A mechanical heart valve is a replacement valve that is not itself subject to repair.

== General ==
Valvuloplasty is the widening of a stenotic valve using a balloon catheter. Types include:

- Aortic valvuloplasty in repair of a stenotic aortic valve
- Mitral valvuloplasty in the correction of an uncomplicated mitral

=== Valvulotomy ===
Commissurotomy of heart valves is called a valvulotomy.

== By valve ==
=== Mitral valve repair ===
Mitral valve repair is mainly used to treat stenosis (narrowing) or regurgitation (leakage) of the mitral valve. A mitral balloon valvuloplasty enlarges the valve opening to allow greater oxygenated blood flow into the left ventricle, and since severe mitral regurgitation can be a major complication, degrees of stenosis, regurgitation, and valve anatomical features are taken into consideration before the procedure.

=== Aortic valve repair ===
Aortic valve repair is a surgical procedure used to correct some aortic valve disorders as an alternative to aortic valve replacement. Aortic valve repair is performed less often and is more technically difficult than mitral valve repair. There are two surgical techniques of aortic-valve repair:

- The Reimplantation-Technique (David-Procedure)
- The Remodeling-Technique (Yacoub-Procedure)

=== Tricuspid valve repair ===
Tricuspid valve repair is used to correct tricuspid regurgitation. Tricuspid regurgitation can be repaired via a minimally invasive procedure where a catheter mounted clip is used to cinch tricuspid valve leaflets together in a process known as the Transcatheter Edge to Edge Repair (TEER).

== History ==
The first two percutaneous ultrasound-guided fetal balloon valvuloplasties, a type of in utero surgery for severe aortic valve obstruction, were reported in 1991.

== See also ==
- Cardiac surgery
- Bentall procedure
- Open aortic surgery
