= Valvular heart disease =

Disease in the valves of the heart

- Phonocardiogram of normal and abnormal heartbeats.
- Specialty: Cardiology
- Diagnostic method: Chest radiograph

Mitral Valve Prolapse murmur
Heart sounds of a 16-year-old girl diagnosed with mitral valve prolapse and mitral regurgitation. Auscultating her heart, a systolic murmur and click are heard. Recorded with the stethoscope over the mitral valve.

Valvular heart disease is any cardiovascular disease process involving one or more of the four valves of the heart (the aortic and mitral valves on the left side of heart and the pulmonic and tricuspid valves on the right side of heart). These conditions occur largely as a consequence of aging, but may also be the result of congenital (inborn) abnormalities or specific disease or physiologic processes including rheumatic heart disease and pregnancy.

Anatomically, the valves are part of the dense connective tissue of the heart known as the cardiac skeleton and are responsible for the regulation of blood flow through the heart and great vessels. Valve failure or dysfunction can result in diminished heart functionality, though the particular consequences are dependent on the type and severity of valvular disease. Treatment of damaged valves may involve medication alone, but often involves surgical valve repair or valve replacement.

== Classification ==
This diagram shows the valves of the heart. The aortic and mitral valves are shown in the left heart, and the tricuspid and pulmonic valves are shown in the right heart.

Stenosis and insufficiency/regurgitation represent the dominant functional and anatomic consequences associated with valvular heart disease. Irrespective of disease process, alterations to the valve occur that produce one or a combination of these conditions. Insufficiency and regurgitation are synonymous terms that describe an inability of the valve to prevent backflow of blood as leaflets of the valve fail to join (coapt) correctly. Stenosis is characterized by a narrowing of the valvular orifice that prevents adequate outflow of blood. Stenosis can also result in insufficiency if thickening of the annulus or leaflets results in inappropriate leaf closure.

| Valve involved | Stenotic disease | Insufficiency/regurgitation disease |
| Aortic valve | Aortic valve stenosis | Aortic insufficiency/regurgitation |
| Mitral valve | Mitral valve stenosis | Mitral insufficiency/regurgitation |
| Tricuspid valve | Tricuspid valve stenosis | Tricuspid insufficiency/regurgitation |
| Pulmonary valve | Pulmonary valve stenosis | Pulmonary insufficiency/regurgitation |

=== Aortic and mitral valve disorders ===
Aortic and mitral valve disorders are left heart diseases that are more prevalent than diseases of the pulmonary or tricuspid valve in the right heart due to the higher pressures in the left heart.

Stenosis of the aortic valve is characterized by a thickening of the valvular annulus or leaflets that limits the ability of blood to be ejected from the left ventricle into the aorta. Stenosis is typically the result of valvular calcification but may be the result of a congenitally malformed bicuspid aortic valve. This defect is characterized by the presence of only two valve leaflets. It may occur in isolation or in concert with other cardiac anomalies.

Aortic insufficiency, or regurgitation, is characterized by an inability of the valve leaflets to appropriately close at the end systole, thus allowing blood to flow inappropriately backward into the left ventricle. Causes of aortic insufficiency in the majority of cases are unknown, or idiopathic. It may be the result of connective tissue or immune disorders, such as Marfan syndrome or systemic lupus erythematosus, respectively. Processes that lead to aortic insufficiency usually involve dilation of the valve annulus, thus displacing the valve leaflets, which are anchored in the annulus.

Mitral stenosis is caused largely by rheumatic heart disease, though is rarely the result of calcification. In some cases, vegetations form on the mitral leaflets as a result of endocarditis, an inflammation of the heart tissue. Mitral stenosis is uncommon and not as age-dependent as other types of valvular disease.

Mitral insufficiency can be caused by dilation of the left heart, often a consequence of heart failure. In these cases, the left ventricle of the heart becomes enlarged and causes displacement of the attached papillary muscles, which control the mitral.

=== Pulmonary and tricuspid valve disorders ===
Pulmonary and tricuspid valve diseases are right heart diseases. Pulmonary valve diseases are the least common heart valve disease in adults.

Pulmonary valve stenosis is often the result of congenital malformations and is observed in isolation or as part of a larger pathologic process, as in Tetralogy of Fallot, Noonan syndrome, and congenital rubella syndrome. Unless the degree of stenosis is severe, individuals with pulmonary stenosis usually have excellent outcomes and better treatment options. Often patients do not require intervention until later in adulthood as a consequence of calcification that occurs with aging.

Pulmonary valve insufficiency occurs commonly in healthy individuals to a very mild extent and does not require intervention. More appreciable insufficiency is typically the result of damage to the valve due to cardiac catheterization, intra-aortic balloon pump insertion, or other surgical manipulations. Additionally, insufficiency may be the result of carcinoid syndrome, inflammatory processes such a rheumatoid disease or endocarditis, or congenital malformations. It may also be secondary to severe pulmonary hypertension.

Tricuspid valve stenosis without co-occurrent regurgitation is highly uncommon and typically the result of rheumatic disease. It may also be the result of congenital abnormalities, carcinoid syndrome, obstructive right atrial tumors (typically lipomas or myxomas), or hypereosinophilic syndromes.

Minor tricuspid insufficiency is common in healthy individuals. In more severe cases it is a consequence of dilation of the right ventricle, leading to displacement of the papillary muscles which control the valve's ability to close. Dilation of the right ventricle occurs secondary to ventricular septal defects, right to left shunting of blood, eisenmenger syndrome, hyperthyroidism, and pulmonary stenosis. Tricuspid insufficiency may also be the result of congenital defects of the tricuspid valve, such as Ebstein's anomaly.

== Signs and symptoms ==
=== Aortic stenosis ===
Symptoms of aortic stenosis may include heart failure symptoms, such as dyspnea on exertion (most frequent symptom), orthopnea and paroxysmal nocturnal dyspnea, angina pectoris, and syncope, usually exertional.

Medical signs of aortic stenosis include pulsus parvus et tardus, that is, diminished and delayed carotid pulse, fourth heart sound, decreased A_{2} sound, sustained apex beat, precordial thrill. Auscultation may reveal a systolic murmur of a harsh crescendo-decrescendo type, heard in 2nd right intercostal space and radiating to the carotid arteries.

=== Aortic regurgitation ===
Patients with aortic regurgitation may experience heart failure symptoms, such as dyspnea on exertion, orthopnea and paroxysmal nocturnal dyspnea, palpitations, and angina pectoris. In acute cases patients may experience cyanosis and circulatory shock.

Medical signs of aortic regurgitation include increased pulse pressure by increased systolic and decreased diastolic blood pressure, but these findings may not be significant if acute. The patient may have a diastolic decrescendo murmur best heard at left sternal border, water hammer pulse, Austin Flint murmur, and a displaced apex beat down and to the left. A third heart sound may be present

=== Mitral stenosis ===
Patients with mitral stenosis may present with heart failure symptoms, such as dyspnea on exertion, orthopnea and paroxysmal nocturnal dyspnea, palpitations, chest pain, hemoptysis, thromboembolism, or ascites and edema (if right-sided heart failure develops). Symptoms of mitral stenosis increase with exercise and pregnancy

On auscultation of a patient with mitral stenosis, typically the most prominent sign is a loud S_{1}. Another finding is an opening snap followed by a low-pitched diastolic rumble with presystolic accentuation. The opening snap follows closer to the S_{2} heart tone with worsening stenosis. The murmur is heard best with the bell of the stethoscope lying on the left side and its duration increases with worsening disease. Advanced disease may present with signs of right-sided heart failure such as parasternal heave, jugular venous distension, hepatomegaly, ascites and/or pulmonary hypertension (presenting with a loud P_{2}). Signs increase with exercise and pregnancy.

=== Mitral regurgitation ===
Patients with mitral regurgitation may present with heart failure symptoms, such as dyspnea on exertion, orthopnea and paroxysmal nocturnal dyspnea, palpitations, or pulmonary edema.

On auscultation of a patient with mitral stenosis, there may be a holosystolic murmur at the apex, radiating to the back or clavicular area, a third heart sound, and a loud, palpable P_{2}, heard best when lying on the left side. Patients also commonly have atrial fibrillation. Patients may have a laterally displaced apex beat, often with heave In acute cases, the murmur and tachycardia may be only distinctive signs.

=== Tricuspid regurgitation ===
Patients with tricuspid regurgitation may experience symptoms of right-sided heart failure, such as ascites, hepatomegaly, edema and jugular venous distension.

Signs of tricuspid regurgitation include pulsatile liver, prominent V waves and rapid y descents in jugular venous pressure. Auscultatory findings include inspiratory third heart sound at left lower sternal border (LLSB) and a blowing holosystolic murmur at LLSB, intensifying with inspiration, and decreasing with expiration and Valsalva maneuver. Patients may have a parasternal heave along LLSB. Atrial fibrillation is usually present in patients with tricuspid regurgitation

== Causes ==
=== Calcific disease ===
Calcification of the leaflets of the aortic valve is a common with increasing age, but the mechanism is likely to be more related to increased lipoprotein deposits and inflammation than the "wear and tear" of advance age. Aortic stenosis due to calcification of tricuspid aortic valve with age comprises >50% of the disease. Aortic stenosis due to calcification of a bicuspid aortic valve comprises about 30–40% of the disease. Hypertension, diabetes mellitus, hyperlipoproteinemia and uremia may speed up the process of valvular calcification.

=== Dysplasia ===
Heart valve dysplasia is an error in the development of any of the heart valves, and a common cause of congenital heart defects in humans as well as animals; tetralogy of Fallot is a congenital heart defect with four abnormalities, one of which is stenosis of the pulmonary valve. Ebstein's anomaly is an abnormality of the tricuspid valve, and its presence can lead to tricuspid valve regurgitation. A bicuspid aortic valve is an aortic valve with only 2 cusps as opposed to the normal 3. It is present in about 0.5% to 2% of the general population and causes increased calcification due to higher turbulent flow through the valve.

=== Connective tissue disorders ===
Marfan's Syndrome is a connective tissue disorder that can lead to chronic aortic or mitral regurgitation. Osteogenesis imperfecta is a disorder in formation of type I collagen and can also lead to chronic aortic regurgitation.

=== Inflammatory disorders ===
Inflammation of the heart valves due to any cause is called valvular endocarditis; this is usually due to bacterial infection but may also be due to cancer (marantic endocarditis), certain autoimmune conditions (Libman-Sacks endocarditis, seen in systemic lupus erythematosus) and hypereosinophilic syndrome (Loeffler endocarditis). Endocarditis of the valves can lead to regurgitation through that valve, which is seen in the tricuspid, mitral, and aortic valves. Certain medications have been associated with valvular heart disease, most prominently ergotamine derivatives pergolide and cabergoline.

Valvular heart disease resulting from rheumatic fever is referred to as rheumatic heart disease. Acute rheumatic fever, which frequently manifests with carditis and valvulitis, is a late sequela of Group A beta-hemolytic streptococcus infection in the throat, often lagging the initial infection by weeks to months. Cardiac involvement is dependent on the cross-reaction of antibodies directed against M proteins produced by bacteria with human proteins present in the myocardium or endocardium (although acute rheumatic fever may present as pancarditis with additional involvement of the pericardium). This results in generalized inflammation in the heart, producing acute erosions and vegetations with fibrin deposition in the mitral valve that may be followed by chronic changes over years to decades, including shortening of the chordae tendinae and thickening or fusion of the mitral leaflets, leading to a severely compromised "buttonhole" or "fish mouth" valve.

In 70% of cases rheumatic heart disease involves only the mitral valve, while 25% of cases involve both the aortic and mitral valves. Involvement of other heart valves without damage to the mitral is exceedingly rare. Mitral stenosis is almost always caused by rheumatic heart disease. Less than 10% of aortic stenosis is caused by rheumatic heart disease. Rheumatic fever can also cause chronic mitral and aortic regurgitation.

While developed countries once had a significant burden of rheumatic fever and rheumatic heart disease, medical advances and improved social conditions have dramatically reduced their incidence. Many developing countries, as well as indigenous populations within developed countries, still carry a significant burden of rheumatic fever and rheumatic heart disease and there has been a resurgence in efforts to eradicate the diseases in these populations. Among persons who have experienced rheumatic fever, long-term intramuscular antibiotic therapy is used as secondary prophylaxis against additional streptococcal infections, which can contribute to progression of rheumatic heart disease. In people with severe valvular disease, however, short-term risks of cardiovascular compromise after intramuscular injections may outweigh the benefits, and oral therapy may be considered instead of IM injections in this subset of patients.

Diseases of the aortic root can cause chronic aortic regurgitation. These diseases include syphilitic aortitis, Behçet's disease, and reactive arthritis.

=== Heart disease ===
Tricuspid regurgitation is usually secondary to right ventricular dilation which may be due to left ventricular failure (the most common cause), right ventricular infarction, inferior myocardial infarction, or cor pulmonale Other causes of tricuspid regurgitation include carcinoid syndrome and myxomatous degeneration.

== Diagnosis ==
=== Aortic stenosis ===
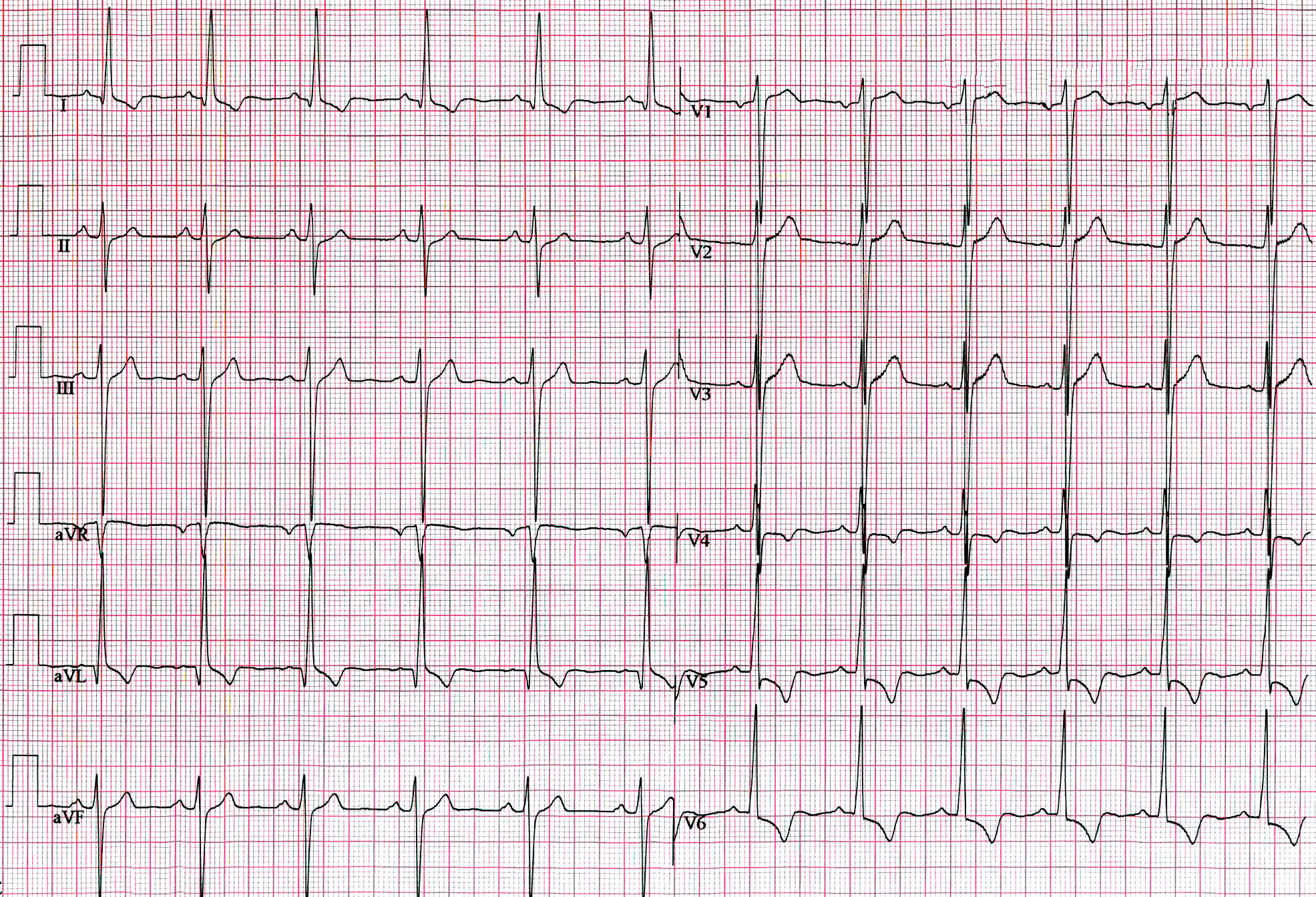
ECG showing left ventricular hypertrophy, these findings may be present in aortic stenosis.

Patients with aortic stenosis can have chest X-ray findings showing dilation of the ascending aorta, but they may also have a completely normal chest X-ray. Direct visualization of calcifications on chest X-ray is uncommon. Other findings include dilation of the left ventricle. ECG typically shows left ventricular hypertrophy in patients with severe stenosis, but it may also show signs of left heart strain. Echocardiography is the diagnostic gold standard, which shows left ventricular hypertrophy, leaflet calcification, and abnormal leaflet closure.

Diagnostic classification of aortic stenosis
| Classification | Valve area |
|---|---|
| Mild aortic stenosis | 1.5-2.0 cm^{2} |
| Moderate aortic stenosis | 1.0-1.5 cm^{2} |
| Severe aortic stenosis | <1.0 cm^{2} |

=== Aortic regurgitation ===
Chest X-ray is not as sensitive as other tests, but it may show aortic root dilation (especially in causes involving the aortic root) and apex displacement. An ECG may show left ventricular hypertrophy and signs of left heart strain. Left axis deviation can be a sign of advanced disease. An echocardiogram can be helpful in determining the root cause of the disease, as it will clearly show aortic root dilation or dissection if it exists. Typically the pump function of the heart during systole is normal, but an echocardiogram will show flow reversal during diastole. This disease is classified using regurgitant fraction (RF), or the amount of volume that flows back through the valve divided by the total forward flow through the valve during systole. Severe disease has an RF of >50%, while progressive aortic regurgitation has an RF of 30–49%.

=== Mitral stenosis ===
Chest x-ray in mitral stenosis will typically show an enlarged left atrium, and may show dilation of the pulmonary veins. ECG can show left atrial enlargement, due to increased pressures in the left atrium. Echocardiography is helpful in determining the severity of the disease by estimating the pulmonary artery systolic pressure. This test can also show leaflet calcification and the pressure gradient over the mitral valve. Severe mitral stenosis is defined as a mitral valve area <1.5 cm^{2}. Progressive mitral stenosis has a normal valve area but will have increased flow velocity across the mitral valve.

=== Mitral regurgitation ===
Chest x-ray in mitral regurgitation can show an enlarged left atrium, as well as pulmonary venous congestion. It may also show valvular calcifications specifically in combined mitral regurgitation and stenosis due to rheumatic heart disease. ECG typically shows left atrial enlargement, but can also show right atrial enlargement if the disease is severe enough to cause pulmonary hypertension. Echocardiography is useful in visualizing the regurgitant flow and calculating the RF. It can also be used to determine the degree of calcification, and the function and closure of the valve leaflets. Severe disease has an RF of >50%, while progressive mitral regurgitation has an RF of <50%.

== Treatment ==
Some of the most common treatments of valvular heart disease are avoiding smoking and excessive alcohol consumption, antibiotics, antithrombotic medications such as aspirin, anticoagulants, balloon dilation, and water pills. In some cases, surgery may be necessary.

=== Aortic stenosis ===
Treatment of aortic stenosis is not necessary in asymptomatic patients, unless the stenosis is classified as severe based on valve hemodynamics. Both asymptomatic severe and symptomatic aortic stenosis are treated with aortic valve replacement (AVR) surgery. AVR surgery can be performed using mechanical or tissue valves depending on age and other relevant factors. Trans-catheter Aortic Valve Implantation (TAVI) is an alternative to AVR and is recommended in high risk patients who may not be suitable for surgical AVR. Any angina is treated with short-acting nitrovasodilators, beta-blockers and/or calcium blockers, although nitrates can drastically decrease blood pressure in patients with severe aortic stenosis and are therefore contraindicated. Any hypertension is treated aggressively, but caution must be taken in administering beta-blockers. Any heart failure is treated with digoxin, diuretics, nitrovasodilators and, if not contraindicated, cautious inpatient administration of ACE inhibitors. Moderate stenosis is monitored with echocardiography every 1–2 years, possibly with supplementary cardiac stress test. Severe stenosis should be monitored with echocardiography every 3–6 months. In patients with non-severe asymptomatic aortic valve stenosis, increased age- and sex adjusted N-terminal pro-brain natriuretic peptide (NT-proBNP) levels alone and combined with a 50% or greater increase from baseline had been found associated with increased event rates of aortic valve stenosis related events (cardiovascular death, hospitalization with heart failure due to progression of aortic valve stenosis, or aortic valve replacement surgery). In patients with non-severe asymptomatic aortic valve stenosis and no overt coronary artery disease, the increased troponin T (above 14 pg/mL) was found associated with an increased 5-year event rate of ischemic cardiac events (myocardial infarction, percutaneous coronary intervention, or coronary artery bypass surgery).

=== Aortic regurgitation ===
Aortic regurgitation is treated with aortic valve replacement, which is recommended in patients with symptomatic severe aortic regurgitation. Aortic valve replacement is also recommended in patients that are asymptomatic but have chronic severe aortic regurgitation and left ventricular ejection fraction of less than 50%. Hypertension is treated in patients with chronic aortic regurgitation, with the anti-hypersensives of choice being calcium channel blockers, ACE inhibitors, or ARBs. Also, endocarditis prophylaxis is indicated before dental, gastrointestinal or genitourinary procedures. Mild to moderate aortic regurgitation should be followed with echocardiography and a cardiac stress test once every 1–2 years. In severe moderate/severe cases, patients should be followed with echocardiography and cardiac stress test and/or isotope perfusion imaging every 3–6 months.

=== Mitral stenosis ===
For patients with symptomatic severe mitral stenosis, percutaneous balloon mitral valvuloplasty (PBMV) is recommended. If this procedure fails, then it may be necessary to undergo mitral valve surgery, which may involve valve replacement, repair, or commisurotomy. Anticoagulation is recommended for patients that have mitral stenosis in the setting of atrial fibrillation or a previous embolic event. No therapy is required for asymptomatic patients. Diuretics may be used to treat pulmonary congestion or edema.

=== Mitral regurgitation ===
Surgery is recommended for chronic severe mitral regurgitation in symptomatic patients with left ventricular ejection fraction (LVEF) of greater than 30%, and asymptomatic patients with LVEF of 30-60% or left ventricular end diastolic volume (LVEDV) > 40%. Surgical repair of the leaflets is preferred to mitral valve replacement as long as the repair is feasible. Mitral regurgitation may be treated medically with vasodilators, diuretics, digoxin, antiarrhythmics, and chronic anticoagulation. Mild to moderate mitral regurgitation should be followed with echocardiography and cardiac stress test every 1–3 years. Severe mitral regurgitation should be followed with echocardiography every 3–6 months.

== Epidemiology ==
In the United States, about 2.5% of the population has moderate to severe valvular heart disease. The prevalence of these diseases increase with age, and 75 year-olds in the United States have a prevalence of about 13%. In industrially underdeveloped regions, rheumatic disease is the most common cause of valve diseases, and it can cause up to 65% of the valve disorders seen in these regions.

=== Aortic stenosis ===
Aortic stenosis is typically the result of aging, occurring in 12.4% of the population over 75 years of age, and represents the most common cause of outflow obstruction in the left ventricle. Bicuspid aortic valves are found in up to 1% of the population, making it one of the most common cardiac abnormalities.

=== Aortic regurgitation ===
The prevalence of aortic regurgitation also increases with age. Moderate to severe disease has a prevalence of 13% in patients between the ages of 55 and 86. This valve disease is primarily caused by aortic root dilation, but infective endocarditis has been an increased risk factor. It has been found to be the cause of aortic regurgitation in up to 25% of surgical cases.

=== Mitral stenosis ===
Mitral stenosis is caused almost exclusively by rheumatic heart disease, and has a prevalence of about 0.1% in the United States. Mitral stenosis is the most common valvular heart disease in pregnancy.

=== Mitral regurgitation ===
Mitral regurgitation is significantly associated with normal aging, rising in prevalence with age. It is estimated to be present in over 9% of people over 75.

== Special populations ==
=== Pregnancy ===
The evaluation of individuals with valvular heart disease who are or wish to become pregnant is a difficult issue. Issues that have to be addressed include the risks during pregnancy to the mother and the developing fetus by the presence of maternal valvular heart disease as a pre-existing disease in pregnancy. Normal physiological changes during pregnancy require, on average, a 50% increase in circulating blood volume that is accompanied by an increase in cardiac output that usually peaks between the midportion of the second and third trimesters. The increased cardiac output is due to an increase in the stroke volume, and a small increase in heart rate, averaging 10 to 20 beats per minute. Additionally uterine circulation and endogenous hormones cause systemic vascular resistance to decrease and a disproportionately lowering of diastolic blood pressure causes a wide pulse pressure. Inferior vena caval obstruction from a gravid uterus in the supine position can result in an abrupt decrease in cardiac preload, which leads to hypotension with weakness and lightheadedness. During labor and delivery cardiac output increases more in part due to the associated anxiety and pain, as well as due to uterine contractions which will cause an increase in systolic and diastolic blood pressure.

Valvular heart lesions associated with high maternal and fetal risk during pregnancy include:

1. Severe aortic stenosis with or without symptoms
2. Aortic regurgitation with NYHA functional class III-IV symptoms
3. Mitral stenosis with NYHA functional class II-IV symptoms
4. Mitral regurgitation with NYHA functional class III-IV symptoms
5. Aortic and/or mitral valve disease resulting in severe pulmonary hypertension (pulmonary pressure greater than 75% of systemic pressures)
6. Aortic and/or mitral valve disease with severe LV dysfunction (EF less than 0.40)
7. Mechanical prosthetic valve requiring anticoagulation
8. Marfan syndrome with or without aortic regurgitation

In individuals who require an artificial heart valve, consideration must be made for deterioration of the valve over time (for bioprosthetic valves) versus the risks of blood clotting in pregnancy with mechanical valves with the resultant need of drugs in pregnancy in the form of anticoagulation.
