= Valvulotomy =

Surgery to relieve the constriction of valvular stenosis

- ICD-9-CM: 35.0

A valvulotomy, valvotomy, valvuloplasty, or valvoplasty is a procedure used in heart valve surgery that consists of making one or more incisions at the edges of the commissure formed between the two (mitral valve), or three tricuspid valve leaflets. This relieves the constriction of valvular stenosis (especially mitral valve stenosis).

As with many other kinds of surgery, a valvulotomy may be carried out using by either open or minimally invasive approaches, and sometimes (but not invariably) the terms surgery and surgical are understood to refer only to the open types, with the minimally invasive types then being referred to as interventional procedures. The minimally invasive approach is through the lumen of a vessel with a catheter, which is why it is often called a transluminal or transcatheter approach. Such approaches begin with a small skin incision to access a vessel that will lead to the heart, making them percutaneous approaches, and they use balloons whose inflation moves the valve leaflets. Thus, all together, they are called by names such as percutaneous balloon valvulotomy, percutaneous balloon mitral valvuloplasty, percutaneous aortic balloon valvotomy, and so forth.

== See also ==
- Heart valve repair
