= Parasternal heave =

Medical sign

A parasternal heave, lift, or thrust is a precordial impulse that may be felt (palpated) in patients with cardiac or respiratory disease. Precordial impulses are visible or palpable pulsations of the chest wall, which originate on the heart or the great vessels.

== Technique ==
A parasternal impulse may be felt when the heel of the hand is rested just to the left of the sternum with the fingers lifted slightly off the chest. Normally no impulse or a slight inward impulse is felt. The heel of the hand is lifted off the chest wall with each systole. Palpation with the fingers over the pulmonary area may reveal the palpable tap of pulmonary valve closure (palpable P2) in cases of pulmonary hypertension.

== Interpretation ==
Parasternal heave occurs during right ventricular hypertrophy (i.e. enlargement) or very rarely severe left atrial enlargement. This is due to the position of the heart within the chest: the right ventricle is most anterior (closest to the chest wall). Hypertrophy of the right side of the heart will occur when the right side of the heart chronically contracts against higher pressure. This occurs in the setting of valvular disease i.e. pulmonary valve, and in the setting of respiratory disease whereby the pressure in the pulmonary artery becomes elevated (e.g., left heart failure and fluid congestion to the right heart, chronic obstructive pulmonary disease, pulmonary hypertension). An example of a condition where parasternal heave can be felt is cor pulmonale. This impulse may also be felt in dilated right ventricular myopathy. The palpation of dilated myopathy differs in that the impulse tends to be vigorous and brief. This is in contrast with the sustained impulse of the hypertrophied right ventricle. A parasternal heave may also be felt in mitral stenosis.

A left ventricular heave (or lift) suggests the possibility of aortic stenosis.
