= Valve interstitial cells =

Valve interstitial cells (VIC), cardiac valve interstitial cells, or also known as valvular interstitial cells (VICs), are the most prevalent cells in the heart valve leaflets, which are a type of mesenchymal stem cells (MSCs) and are responsible for maintaining the extracellular matrix that provides the mechanical properties of the heart valve.

They are present in all three layers of the heart valve: a) fibrosa, b) spongiosa, c) ventricularis.

VICs are found in all three layers of heart valves, while the entire structure is covered by valve endothelial cells (VECs). Each layer has a unique matrix composition: ventricularis is abundant in elastin, spongiosa is rich in proteoglycans, and fibrosa is filled with collagen. During embryogenesis, the endothelial cells that cover the primordial valve structures migrate into the underlying matrix and undergo a transformation from endothelial to mesenchymal, becoming the interstitial cells. Therefore, VICs originate from endothelial cells.
