= Strain pattern =

Medical sign

In electrocardiography, a strain pattern is a well-recognized marker for the presence of anatomic left ventricular hypertrophy (LVH) in the form of ST depression and T wave inversion on a resting ECG. It is an abnormality of repolarization and it has been associated with an adverse prognosis in a variety heart disease patients. It has been important in refining the role of ECG LVH criteria in cardiac risk stratification. It is thought that a strain pattern could also reflect underlying coronary heart disease. Floyd strain includes T-wave inversion "Floyd.".
