= Commissurotomy =

Surgical incision

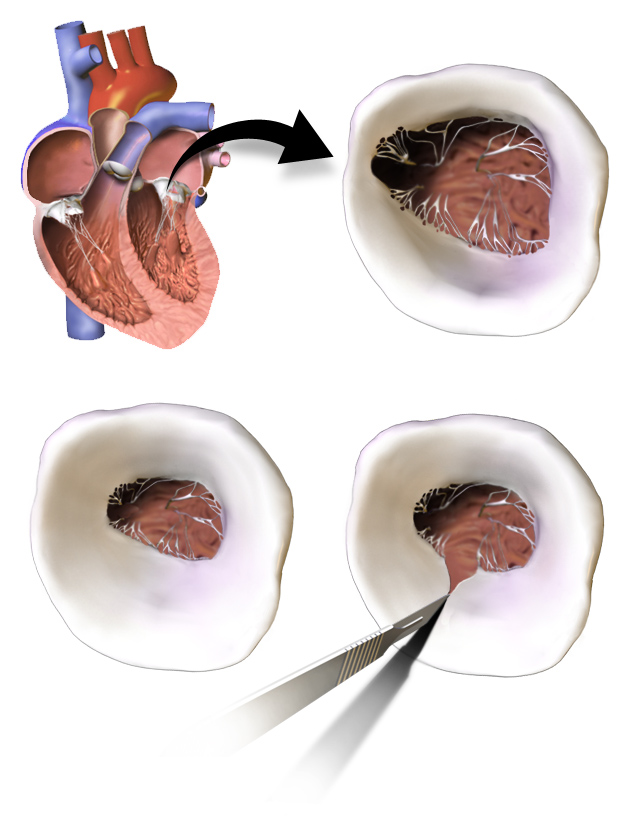
- Illustration demonstrating an open-heart surgery to repair a mitral valve that is narrowed from mitral valve stenosis.

A commissurotomy (/ˌkɒməʃərˈɒtəmi/) is a surgical incision of a commissure in the body, as one made in the heart at the edges of the commissure formed by cardiac valves, or one made in the brain to treat certain psychiatric disorders.

Patients with scleroderma, a disease that thickens and hardens the skin, sometimes require oral commissurotomy to open the corners of the mouth, the commissures, to allow dental treatment. This procedure often leaves characteristic scars.

== In cardiac valves ==
Commissurotomy of cardiac valves is called valvulotomy, and consists of making one or more incisions at the edges of the commissure formed between two or three valves, in order to relieve constriction such as occurs in valvular stenosis, especially mitral valve stenosis.

== In neurosurgery ==
In neurosurgery, as a treatment for severe epilepsy, the corpus callosum, or the area of the brain that connects the two hemispheres, would be completely bisected. By eliminating the connection between the two hemispheres of a patient's brain, electrical communication would be cut off greatly diminishing the amount and severity of the epileptic seizures. For some, seizures would be completely eliminated.

Though no effect on behavior was observed after commissurotomy was performed on monkeys, it gave peculiar effects on human perception. Different functions of cognition are predominantly located on one of the hemispheres. For example, Broca's area, crucial for forming sentences, is on most people situated in the left hemisphere ventral to the facial motor cortex. The left hemisphere is referred to as the "talking" hemisphere and the right the "silent". A commisurotomy prevents any sensory input to the silent hemisphere from reaching the talking hemisphere. Since the left visual field is processed in the right hemisphere, a person with a commissurotomy is unable to describe objects to the left, because the "talking" hemisphere has not seen anything. It appears as though the person had not seen anything at all, and it does not bother him either. It can be demonstrated that stimuli to the right hemisphere for example give emotional response, but because of the severed corpus callosum it cannot be verbalized.
