= Pulsus bisferiens =

- Other names: Bisferious pulse, biphasic pulse
- Specialty: Cardiology

Pulsus bisferiens, also known as biphasic pulse, is an aortic waveform with two peaks per cardiac cycle, a small one followed by a strong and broad one. It is a sign of problems with the aorta, including aortic stenosis and aortic regurgitation, as well as hypertrophic cardiomyopathy causing subaortic stenosis.

== Pathogenesis ==
In hypertrophic cardiomyopathy, there is narrowing of the left ventricular outflow tract (LVOT) due to hypertrophy of the interventricular septum. During systole, the narrowing of the LVOT creates a more negative pressure due to the Venturi effect and sucks in the anterior mitral valve leaflet. This creates a transient occlusion of the LVOT, causing a midsystolic dip in the aortic waveform. Towards the end of systole, the ventricle is able to overcome the obstruction to cause the second rise in the aortic waveform.

In severe aortic regurgitation, additional blood reenters the left ventricle during diastole. This added volume of blood must be pumped out during ventricular systole. The rapid flow of blood during systole is thought to draw the walls of the aorta together due to the Venturi effect, temporarily decreasing blood flow during midsystole.

A recent paper theorized that an alternative explanation for pulsus bisferiens may be due to a forward moving suction wave occurring during mid-systole.
