= Pulsus alternans =

- Other names: Cardiac alternans, mechanical alternans
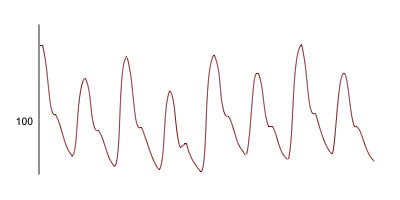
- Pulse pressure waveform displaying the variation in pressure between beats in pulsus alternans.
- Specialty: Cardiology

Pulsus alternans is a physical finding with arterial pulse waveform showing alternating strong and weak beats. It is almost always indicative of left ventricular systolic impairment, and carries a poor prognosis.

The condition is relatively rare, and patients with the greatest risk for developing pulsus alternans include those with heart failure, cardiomyopathy, coronary artery disease, or other cardiac risk factors.

== Pathophysiology ==
One explanation is that in left ventricular dysfunction, the ejection fraction will decrease significantly, causing reduction in stroke volume, hence causing an increase in end-diastolic volume. As a result, during the next cycle of systolic phase, the myocardial muscle will be stretched more than usual and as a result there will be an increase in myocardial contraction, related to the Frank–Starling physiology of the heart. This results, in turn, in a stronger systolic pulse. There may initially be a tachycardia as a compensatory mechanism to try to maintain cardiac output. Other explanation is due to the heterogeneity of the refractory period between the healthy and diseased myocardial cells.

== Diagnosis ==
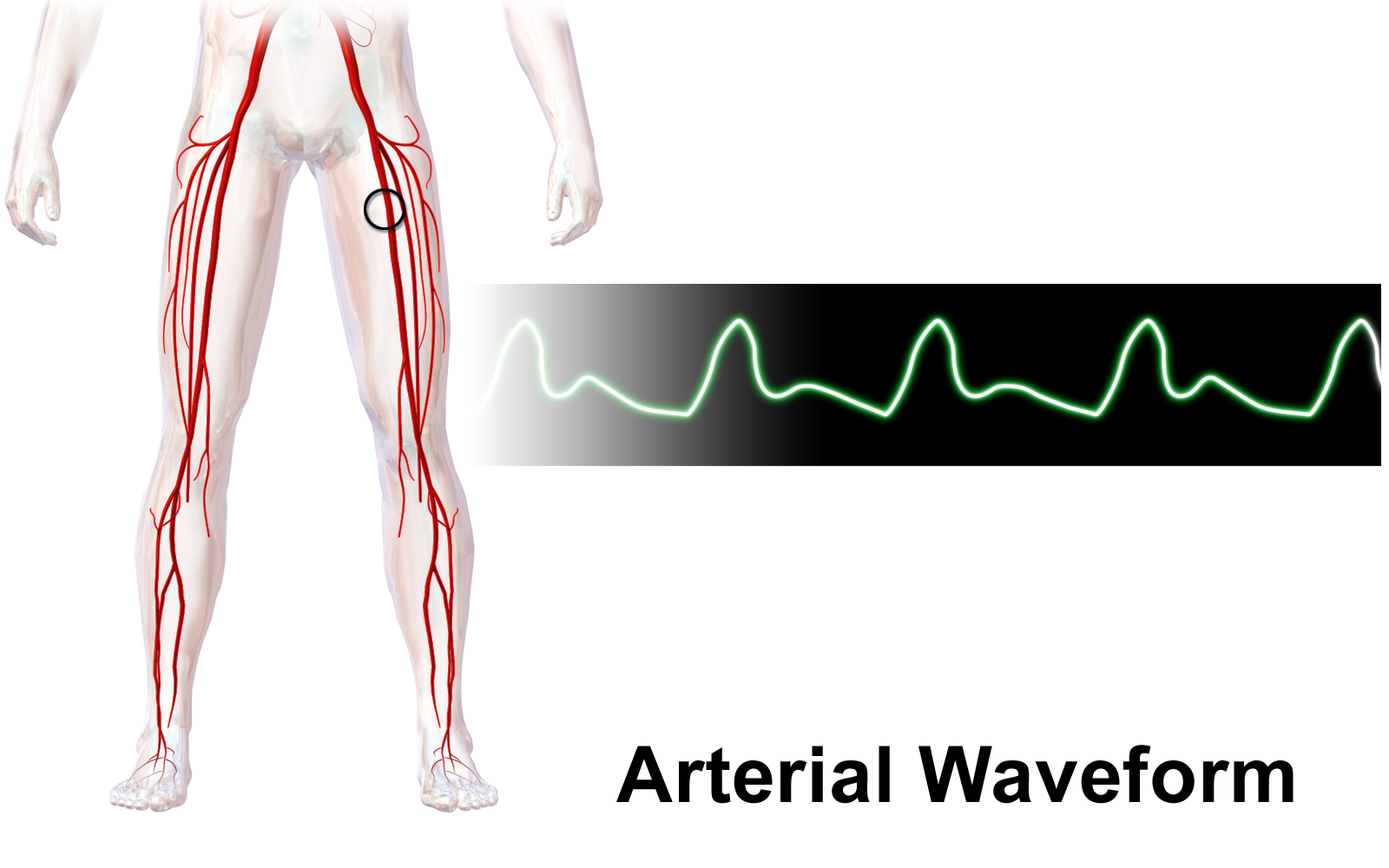
Arterial waveform.

Pulsus alternans is diagnosed by first palpating the radial or femoral arteries, feeling for a regular rhythm but alternating strong and weak pulses. Next, a blood pressure cuff is used to confirm the finding: the cuff is elevated past systolic pressure and then slowly lowered cuff towards the systolic level. If alternating loud and soft Korotkoff sounds are heard, pulsus alternans is indicated.

== Clinical significance ==
A finding of pulsus alternans is indicative of severe left-sided heart failure.

== In literature ==
D. H. Lawrence describes pulsus alternans in his novel, Sons and Lovers:

Then he felt her pulse. There was a strong stroke and a weak one, like a sound and its echo. That was supposed to betoken the end....
