= Embryocardia =

- Specialty: Neonatology

Embryocardia is a condition in which S_{1} and S_{2} (the two heart sounds that produce the typical "lubb-dubb" sound of the heart) become indistinguishable and equally spaced. Thus the normal "lubb-dubb" rhythm of the heart becomes a "tic-toc" rhythm resembling the heart sounds of a fetus. This indicates a serious loss of natural fluctuation and often precedes a fatal collapse. This condition is observed in myocarditis.
