= Bioradiolocation =

Bio-radiolocation is a technology for remote detection and diagnostics of biological objects by means of radar, even behind optically opaque obstacles. Devices based on this method are called bio-radars.

== Theoretical basis ==
This technology is based on the reflected signal modulation caused by movements of the human body and internal organs. While the examinee maintains a calm state (e.g. is sleeping or sitting in a fixed pose) modulation of bio-radar signal is caused mainly by respiratory movements (0.2-0.5 Hz) and heart and superficial arteries pulsations (0.5–20 Hz). The amplitude of thorax surface displacement caused by respiratory muscles contractions is about 1 cm, while the same parameter for heart beating is only 1 mm. Recently, researchers showed that heart sounds (20–80 Hz) with an amplitude in the micrometer range can be detected, too. The order of registered parameters determines the usage of microwave frequency band. Impulse, linearly or step-frequency modulated and monochromatic signals can be used as probing ones.

== Applications ==
The main advantage of bio-radiolocation is its remote and contactless nature. At present, commercially available bio-radars are aimed at the detection of people and at tracking them behind buildings or other obstacles (e.g. during antiterrorist operations). There are also bio-radars, used by rescuers for finding people under building debris. However, such devices have not found widespread application in disaster rescue operations due to fundamental limitations of the method related to noises and background reflections.

The most promising area in which bio-radiolocation method may be applied is medicine. Bio-radar can be used in sleep medicine for sleep apnea syndrome monitoring in adults and newborns. Furthermore, it can be used for the measurement of heart sounds and to extract heart rate variability. In addition, they can be applied in a host of other fields, such as professional selection, pharmacology, and zoo-psychology, etc.
