= Alexander George Gibson =

British physician, pathologist and cardiologist

- Born: 21 September 1875; Kingston upon Hull
- Died: 11 January 1950 (aged 74); Oxford
- Occupations: Physician and lecturer in morbid anatomy, Oxford
- Known for: discovery in 1907 of the third heart sound
- Spouse: Constance Muriel Jones
- Children: 3

Alexander George Gibson FRCP (21 September 1875 – 11 January 1950) was a British physician, pathologist, and cardiologist.

== Biography ==
Alexander Gibson graduated in 1895 from University College, Aberystwyth with a BSc, and then in 1900 from Christ Church, Oxford with a first-class BA honours degree in Natural Sciences. After completing his medical training at St Thomas’ Hospital, he took his BM in 1904. After briefly holding a house appointment at St Thomas' Hospital, in 1904 he became a house physician at the Radcliffe Infirmary in Oxford; in 1911 he became an assistant pathologist. He qualified MRCP in 1905 and graduated DM (Oxon.) in 1908. He was elected FRCP in 1913.

During the First World War Gibson served as a Major in the 3rd Southern General Hospital in Oxford, and upon demobilisation in 1919 was appointed a full physician at the Radcliffe Infirmary. At the University of Oxford he was successively appointed Demonstrator of Pathology, Lecturer on Morbid Anatomy, and Reader (latterly Nuffield Reader) in Morbid Anatomy.

In the early days at Oxford, Gibson had a small general practice in addition to being engaged on pathological teaching and research as University demonstrator at the Museum and as Pathologist to the Radcliffe Infirmary. Later he embarked on consultant practice, becoming particularly interested in cardiology.

... a third heart sound was described by Gibson (1907) and Hirschfelder (1907). This sound is heard in only a proportion of subjects. ... Einthoven (1907) was the first to note the appearance of vibration on phonocardiograms at the time of the third heart sound, and these vibrations have since been studied by many workers, using various types of phonocardiograph.

Gibson chaired the meeting which formed the Cardiac Club on 22 April 1922. The Cardiac Club became in 1937 the Cardiac Society of Great Britain and Ireland, and is now known as the British Cardiovascular Society.

In 1921 at the London Hospital Medical College, Gibson delivered the Schorstein Lecture. Under the auspices of the Royal College of Physicians, he gave in 1928 the Bradshaw Lecture on pyelitis and pyelonephritis.

Gardening and natural life provided recreations for his leisure, and his understanding of the history of medicine was shown by his books, The Radcliffe Infirmary (1926) and The Physician's Art (1933), an elaboration of Locke’s De Arte Medica.

For the Quarterly Journal of Medicine he was one of the editors from 1929 to 1937 and served as the secretary for the editorial board from 1907 to 1937. He was the co-author with William Tregonwell Collier (1889–1932) of Methods of Clinical Diagnosis (1927).

In 1937 Gibson was made a Fellow of Merton College, Oxford, a position he held until 1942.

Gibson married Constance Muriel Jones. They had two sons and a daughter.
