= Arthur D. Hirschfelder =

American cardiologist

- Born: September 29, 1879; San Francisco, California, U.S.
- Died: October 11, 1942 (aged 63); Minneapolis, Minnesota, U.S.
- Education: University of California, Berkeley Johns Hopkins University School of Medicine San Francisco General Hospital Residency
- Occupation: Cardiologist- Johns Hopkins University School of Medicine Pharmacologist- University of Minnesota
- Spouse: May Rosalie Strauss Hirschfelder
- Children: Rosalie Claire Hirschfelder Joseph Oakland Hirschfelder
- Honours: Nominated for 1931 Nobel Prize in Physiology and Medicine

Arthur Douglas Hirschfelder (September 29, 1879 – October 11, 1942) was an American cardiologist who interned under William Osler at the Johns Hopkins University School of Medicine in Baltimore, Maryland, where he later became the head of a physiological laboratory in the Department of Medicine. He is best known for his research on local anesthesia and for treating heart illnesses. Hirschfelder is also widely known as being the first full-time cardiologist at Johns Hopkins University.

== Biography ==
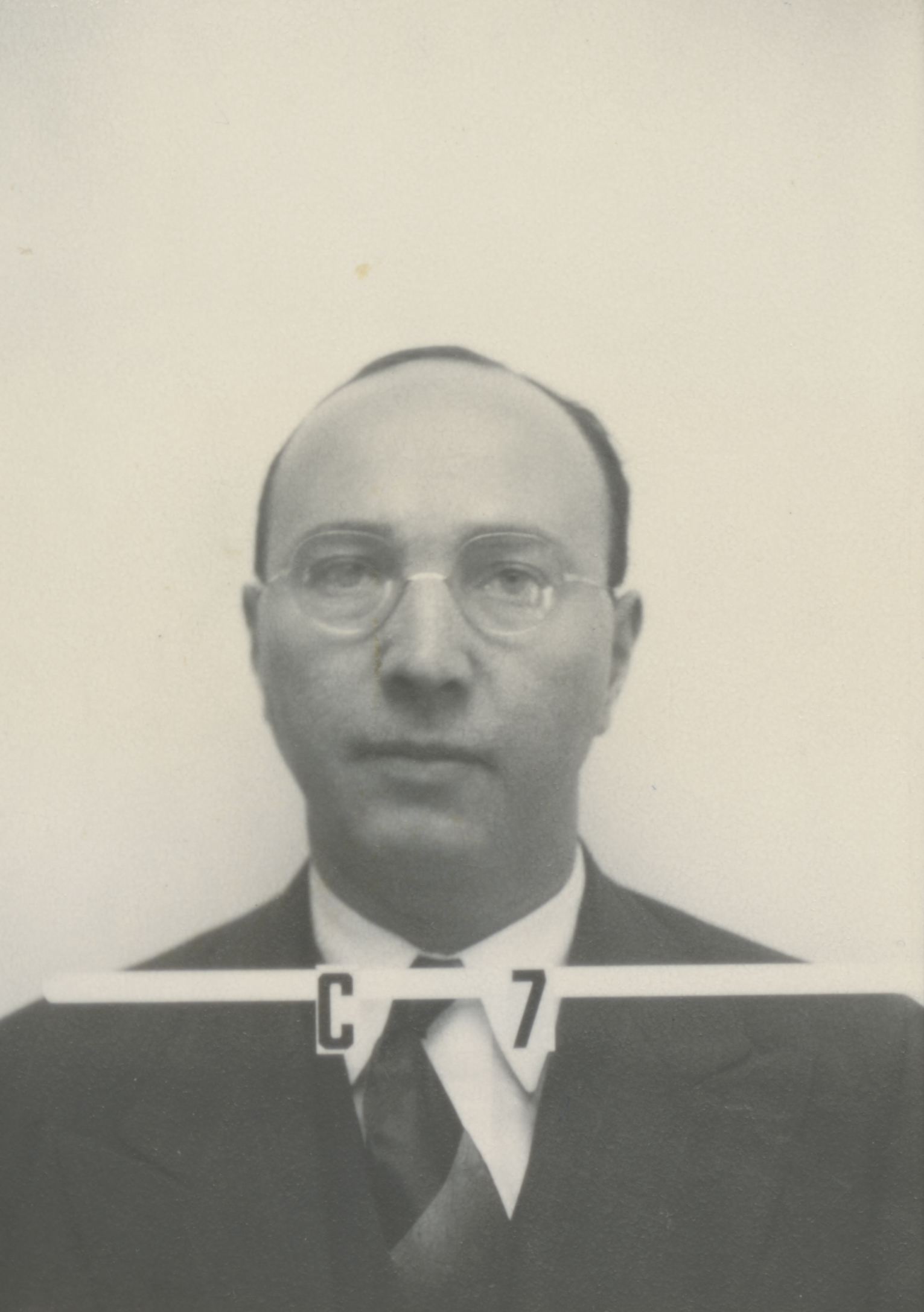
Joseph O. Hirschfelder, Arthur Hirchfelder's Son

=== Personal life ===
==== Parents ====
Hirschfelder was born on September 29, 1879, in San Francisco, California, to Clara Honigsberg and physician Joseph Oakland Hirschfelder. His father, Joseph, emigrated from Germany to California, United States in 1843 where he attended University of California and graduated the first in his class. Later, he became a professor of medicine at Cooper Medical College, now known as the Stanford University School of Medicine, where he became the first professor to highlight the importance of accurate bedside records. Joseph played a significant role in Arthur's choice of career, greatly influencing his desire to become a physician. His father Joseph Hirschfelder died at the age of 65 on July 4, 1920, due to a sudden case of heart failure.

==== Family ====
On June 26, 1905, Arthur married May Rosalie Strauss and on March 5, 1907, May Strauss gave birth to their first child, Rosalie Claire Hirschfelder. Four years later, on May 27, 1911, Arthur Hirschfelder and May Rosalie Strauss gave birth to their son, Joseph Oakland Hirschfelder.

=== Education ===
Arthur D. Hirschfelder graduated from high school at the age of thirteen, and continued his education at the University of California, Berkeley where he graduated with a B.S. in zoology in 1897. Afterwards, he moved to France and continued his studies at the Pasteur Institute before spending and additional two years in Germany at the Heidelberg University to study medicine until 1899. Hirschfelder later pursued medicine at the Johns Hopkins University School of Medicine, where he received his M.D. in 1903. Hirchfelder remained at Hopkins for a year afterwards, interning for William Osler before spending the next year working as a resident under his father at the San Francisco General Hospital.

=== Career ===
Arthur Hirschfelder returned to Johns Hopkins as chief of the new physiological laboratory of the Department of Medicine in 1905. It was at Johns Hopkins that Hirschfelder pursued research on the electrocardiogram (also known as the EKG or ECG) in humans and became the first doctor to do so. In 1907 Hirschfelder and A. G. Gibson independently discovered what is now called the "third heart sound".

During the spring of 1913, after Hirschfelder wrote a paper on "Diuretics in Cardiovascular Disease" and presented it at the American Medical Association meeting, Charles Lyman Green, a professor of pharmacology at the University of Minnesota College of Medical Sciences, offered Hirschfelder a professorship position in pharmacology at Minnesota. Hirschfelder accepted the position and moved to Minneapolis, Minnesota where he pursued research on local anesthesia. He remained as the first director of the Department of Pharmacology until 1942. During World War I, Hirschfelder organized and taught school for navy pharmacists mates at the University of Minnesota. He also developed an improve a cloth designed to kill lice with brominated and chlorinated cresol compounds that would last for thirteen days, an improvement from the ordinary cresol and naphthol treatment, which only lasted for one day. Furthering his war effort, Hirschfelder worked as a pharmacologist in the Chemical Warfare Service research unit at Johns Hopkins in 1918 and after the war served as a board member of the Board of Consultants of the Chemical Warfare Service at Edgewood Arsenal from 1922 to 1925.

== Medicine ==
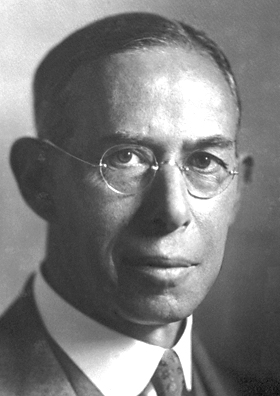
Joseph Erlanger, Arthur's Hopkins partner in the cardiac research

=== Research ===
==== Johns Hopkins University ====
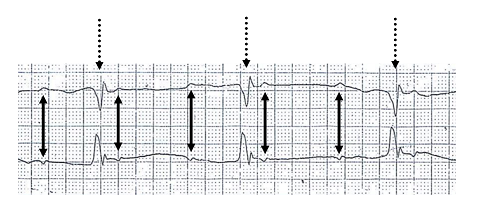
The EKG of a third degree heart block

Hirschfelder dug into the cardiac world upon returning to Johns Hopkins by studying how cardiac nerves behaved during a third-degree atrioventricular block (AV block- also known as a complete heart block). In this condition, the ability of the heart to relay electrical signals from the atria to the ventricles is compromised. Hirschfelder and one of Johns Hopkins's physiologists, Joseph Erlanger, worked together to develop important methods in cardiovascular medicine and became the first doctor in the United States to use an EKG in human studies. Hirschfelder was able to prove, through an experiment on dogs, that the dyspnea that arises due to heart failure occurs when the pulmonary capillaries and veins become inactive. When this occurs, the flexibility of the lungs is inhibited causing the volume of the lungs to increase and therefore diminish flow of air through the lungs.

In a separate experiment to find factors that affected a complete stop of the ventricles, Hirschfelder and Erlanger discovered that when a clamp was tightened over the auriculoventricular (atrialventricular) bundle suddenly a complete stoppage of the ventricles occurred. On the other hand, when the clamps were tightened gradually, the heart passed through various stages of partial block. Through this experiment, Hirschfelder and Erlanger discovered that in order to pass off an atrioventricular block, the auricles must be slowed down. In stimulating the vagus the degree of heart-block increases thereby facilitating the stoppage of the heart block.

In an experiment that underwent not long after, Hirschfelder and Erlager studied the effects of time on the stoppage and were able to conclude that the weaker the ventricular muscle, the longer the stoppage.

==== University of Minnesota ====
After moving to Minnesota in 1913, Hirschfelder began pursuing research directed toward pharmacology. It is said that Arthur Hirschfelder was unable to attain a license to practice medicine in Minnesota because when as a medical student at Johns Hopkins, the medical institute did not provide a "physical diagnosis" course which is required and stated in the Minnesota Medical Practice Act. Due to this reason, Hirschfelder directed his focus towards pharmacology. He met Merrill C. Hart, an organic chemist, whom he collaborated with in researching organic compounds to use as anesthesia. Through this research, Hirschfelder and Hart synthesized and discovered local anesthesia made of saligenin to replace the use of cocaine in cystoscopy. This 4% solution drug is mildly antiseptic with the ability to kill 2% of pyogenic cocci bacteria in less than 30 minutes. This anesthesia had poor longevity and was not considered as a clinical option.

Later in 1913, Hirschfelder published part II of his book on Diseases of the Heart and Aorta. In this, he discussed the effects of drugs on various cardiac diseases, detailing the pharmacological and therapeutic uses of various drugs.

===== Calcium Salts =====
Hirschfelder listed calcium salts as cardiac stimulants and discovered that calcium lactate, previously used to treat typhoid fever, had no effect on controlling pulse-rate and blood-pressure. However, when researchers injected calcium chloride into the heart, the heart was able to revive to a regular heart rhythm with moderately high blood pressure.

===== Caffeine =====
Through various papers and the plethora experiments occurring around the world of caffeine, Hirschfelder knew caffeine with become the next big thing in the cardiac world. Hirschfelder stresses the consequences of the therapeutic use of caffeine. Upon ingestion, caffeine's ability to relieve drowsiness, Hirschfelder was able to find that its pros were often accompanied by insomnia, nausea, vomiting, vertigo, palpitation, and more. He noticed that these negative side-effects set in at the same time, or earlier, than the time it took for the therapeutic effects to kick in.

===== Theobromine =====
Theobromine acts in a similar fashion as caffeine but less extreme which is why French clinicians recommend the use of theobromine as a cardiac stimulant. However, due to its irritative quality on the kidneys, acettheobromine and acettheocin sodium are preferred over theobromine sodium salicylate.

==== Aconite ====
Aconitum is the dried tuberous root of a plant aconitum napellus which has three pharmacological actions upon the circulatory system. One function is to stimulate the vagus nerve quickly and to a high degree. Another function of aconite is to diminish the size and force of cardiac contractions while accelerating the heart, and the third function of aconite is to stimulate the vasomotor center. This drug, however, lowers the activity of the respiratory center and may cause dyspnoea, shortness of breath.

===== Adrenaline =====
Adrenaline was found to raise the blood-pressure by constricting the peripheral blood-vessels and stimulating the heart. However, because of its poor longevity, effects lasting for one to two minutes, it was deemed useless.

===== Epsom Salt =====
In 1934, Arthur Hirschfelder and his technician Victor Haury researched on the epsom salt purgation in nephritis. Their results indicated that when a person without injured kidneys ingested epsom salt, despite the amount of magnesium absorbed into the body, the concentration of magnesium in the blood remained unaffected and in the normal range (1.8-2.5 mg). However, in nephritic patients, the magnesium excreted by the kidneys is lower than normal and therefore produces an exponential increase in plasma magnesium, magnesium in the blood when a single dose of epsom salt is ingested. If the plasma magnesium level is to exceed 17 mg per hundred cubic centimeters of blood, the patient will fall into a coma. In their study on animals, results indicated that those with a slightly raised plasma magnesium level (5 or more mg) are more sensitive to normal doses of morphine. Hirschfelder states that that is why Dr. Osler said, "in severe nephritics and very old persons morphine should be given with caution".

== Publications ==
In 1910, Hirschfelder published Disease of the Heart and Aorta which was highly influential and regarded as the first complete monograph on the subject published in the United States.

An Investigation of the Louse Problem by Arthur Douglass Hirschfelder and William Moore was published in 1919.

"Clinical Manifestations of High and Low Plasma Magnesium- Dangers of Epsom salt Purgation in Nephritis" published in 1934.

== Awards and membership ==
From 1912 on, Arthur Hirschfelder was considered a member of the American Association of Anatomists (AAA). The AAA, situated in Bethesda, Maryland, is a group focused on advancing anatomical sciences in health and diseases.

In 1931, Arthur D. Hirschfelder was nominated for the Nobel Prize in Physiology and Medicine.

== Death and legacy ==
In 1929 Arthur D. Hirschfelder developed a cardiovascular problem which inhibited his ability to work. He stayed at the University of Minnesota until 1942. Arthur D. Hirschfelder died on October 11, 1942, at the age of 63 in Minneapolis, Minnesota.
