= Fourth heart sound =

- Other names: Atrial gallop, presystolic gallop
- Diagram of the heart.
- Specialty: Cardiology

The fourth heart sound or S_{4} is an extra heart sound that occurs during late diastole, immediately before the normal two "lub-dub" heart sounds (S_{1} and S_{2}). It occurs just after atrial contraction and immediately before the systolic S_{1} and is caused by the atria contracting forcefully in an effort to overcome an abnormally stiff or hypertrophic ventricle.

This produces a rhythm classically compared to the cadence of the word "Tennessee." One can also use the phrase "A-stiff-wall" to help with the cadence (a S_{4}, stiff S_{1}, wall S_{2}), as well as the pathology of the S_{4} sound.

== Physiology ==
The normal heart sounds, S_{1} and S_{2}, are produced during the closing of the atrioventricular valves and semilunar valves, respectively. The closing of these valves produces a brief period of turbulent flow, which produces sound.

The S_{4} sound occurs, by definition, immediately before S_{1}, while the atria of the heart are vigorously contracting. It is manifest as a vibration of 20 to 30 Hz within the ventricle. While the mechanism is not absolutely certain, it is generally accepted that S_{4} is caused by stiffening of the walls of the ventricles (usually the left), which produces abnormally turbulent flow as the atria contract to force blood into the ventricle. This for example occurs in conditions that decrease ventricular compliance like left ventricular hypertrophy.

S_{4} is sometimes audible in the elderly due to a more rigid ventricle. When loud, it is a sign of a pathologic state, usually a failing left ventricle. If the problem lies with the left ventricle, the gallop rhythm will be heard best at the cardiac apex. It will become more apparent with exercise, with the patient lying on the left-hand side, or with the patient holding expiration. If the problem is in the right ventricle, the abnormal sound will be most evident on the lower left hand side of the sternum and will get louder with exercise and quick, deep inspiration.

S_{4} has also been termed an atrial gallop or a presystolic gallop because of its occurrence late in the heart cycle. It is a type of gallop rhythm by virtue of having an extra sound; the other gallop rhythm is called S_{3}. The two are quite different, but they may sometimes occur together forming a quadruple gallop. If the heart rate is also very fast (tachycardia), it can become difficult to distinguish between S_{3} and S_{4} thus producing a single sound called a summation gallop.

== Treatment ==
The S4 heart sound itself does not require treatment; rather plans should be laid to stop the progression of whatever causes the underlying ventricular dysfunction. The S4 heart sound is a secondary manifestation of a primary disease process and treatment should be focused on treating the underlying, primary disease.
