= Split S2 =

Medical diagnosis

Wiggers diagram of various events of a cardiac cycle, with 2nd heart sound at bottom.

A split S2 is a finding upon auscultation of the S2 heart sound.

It is caused when the closure of the aortic valve (A_{2}) and the closure of the pulmonary valve (P_{2}) are not synchronized during inspiration. The second heart sound (S2) is caused by the closure of the aortic and pulmonic valves, which causes vibration of the valve leaflets and the adjacent structures. The aortic valve closes slightly before the pulmonic, and this difference is accentuated during inspiration when S2 splits into two distinct components (physiological splitting). During expiration, the pulmonic valve closes at nearly the same time as the aortic, and splitting of S2 cannot be heard.

Exercise increases the intensity of both the aortic and pulmonic components of S2, whereas deep inspiration increases the intensity of the pulmonic component only.

== Physiological split ==
During inspiration, the chest wall expands and causes the intrathoracic pressure to become more negative (akin to a vacuum). The increased negative pressure allows the lungs to fill with air and expand. While doing so, it also induces an increase in venous blood return from the body into the right atrium via the superior and inferior venae cavae, and into the right ventricle by increasing the pressure gradient (blood is being pulled by the vacuum from the body and towards the right side of the heart). Simultaneously, there is a reduction in blood volume returning from the lungs into the left atrium (the blood wants to stay in the lungs because of the vacuum surrounding the lungs, and PVR is lower because of lung expansion). Since there is an increase in blood volume in the right ventricle during inspiration, the pulmonary valve (P_{2} component of S_{2}) stays open longer during ventricular systole due to an increase in ventricular emptying time, whereas the aortic valve (A_{2} component of S_{2}) closes slightly earlier due to a reduction in left ventricular volume and ventricular emptying time. Thus the P_{2} component of S_{2} is delayed relative to that of the A_{2} component. This delay in P_{2} versus A_{2} is heard as a slight broadening or even "splitting" of the second heart sound; though it is usually only heard in the pulmonic area of the chest because the P_{2} is soft and not heard in other areas.

During expiration, the chest wall collapses and decreases the negative intrathoracic pressure (compared to inspiration). Therefore, there is no longer an increase in blood return to the right ventricle versus the left ventricle and the right ventricle volume is no longer increased. This allows the pulmonary valve to close earlier such that it overlaps the closing of the aortic valve, and the split is no longer heard.

It is physiologically normal to hear a "splitting" of the second heart tone in younger people, during inspiration and in the "pulmonary area", i.e. the second ICS (intercostal space) at the left edge of the sternum.

=== Steps ===
1. Chest wall expands during inspiration
2. Intrathoracic pressure becomes more negative to form a vacuum
3. Venous return from the body to the right heart increases, venous return from the lungs to the left heart decreases

=== Analysis of pressure ===
According to Harrison's Principles of Internal Medicine, "Normally, blood pressure falls during inspiration (equal or less than 10 mmHg), due to an increase in blood flow into the right ventricle with displacement of the interventricular septum to the left, decreasing left ventricular filling and cardiac output".

The pressure in the right ventricle tries to open the pulmonary valve. The pressure in the pulmonary artery tries to close the pulmonary valve. The higher pressure will "win". Hence, the closure of the pulmonary valve (P_{2}) will be delayed since the pressure in the right ventricle is increased in inspiration, opposing the pressure in the pulmonary artery and keeping it open longer than in expiration. The change in A_{2} is not that evident. Thus P_{2} appears after A_{2} in inspiration.

== Pathological split ==
The different types of split S_{2} can be associated with medical conditions:

- Split during inspiration: normal. (See above)
- Wide splitting: seen in conditions that delay RV emptying (pulmonic stenosis, right bundle branch block). Delay in RV emptying causes delayed pulmonic sound (regardless of breath); it is an exaggeration of normal splitting sounds.
- Split during expiration: Reverse splitting (paradoxical splitting) indicates pathology due to delay of aortic valve closing. Aortic stenosis, hypertrophic cardiomyopathy, left bundle branch block (LBBB), and a ventricular pacemaker could all cause a reverse splitting of the second heart sound.
- Split during both inspiration and expiration:
  - If splitting does not vary with inspiration, it is termed a "fixed split S_{2}" and is usually due to a septal defect, such as an atrial septal defect (ASD). The ASD creates a left to right shunt that increases the blood flow to the right side of the heart, thereby causing the pulmonary valve to close later than the aortic valve independent of inspiration/expiration.
  - A bundle branch block either LBBB or RBBB, (although RBBB is known to be associated only with S1 split), will produce continuous splitting but the degree of splitting will still vary with respiration.

When the pulmonary valve closes before the aortic valve, this is known as a "paradoxically split S_{2}". On physical exam, paradoxical splitting is appreciated as increased splitting on expiration relative to inspiration, versus normal splitting where inspiration will increase splitting. It is seen in conditions that delay left ventricular emptying (e.g., aortic stenosis, left bundle branch block).
