= Heart sounds =

Noise generated by the heart

Emily's racing heartbeat
Heart sounds of a 16 year old girl immediately after running, with a heart rate of 186 BPM. The S1 heart sound is intensified due to the increased cardiac output.

Emily’s heartbeat
Normal heart sounds of a 16 year old girl at rest, as heard with a stethoscope.

Front of thorax, showing surface relations of bones, lungs (purple), pleura (blue), and heart (red outline). The locations of best auscultation for each heart valve are labeled with "M", "T", "A", and "P". First heart sound: caused by atrioventricular valves – Mitral (M) and Tricuspid (T). Second heart sound caused by semilunar valves – Aortic (A) and Pulmonary/Pulmonic (P).

Heart sounds are the noises generated by the beating heart and the resultant flow of blood through it. Specifically, the sounds reflect the turbulence created when the heart valves snap shut. In cardiac auscultation, an examiner may use a stethoscope to listen for these unique and distinct sounds that provide important auditory data regarding the condition of the heart.

In healthy adults, there are two normal heart sounds, often described as a lub and a dub that occur in sequence with each heartbeat. These are the first heart sound (S_{1}) and second heart sound (S_{2}), produced by the closing of the atrioventricular valves and semilunar valves, respectively. In addition to these normal sounds, a variety of other sounds may be present including heart murmurs, adventitious sounds, and gallop rhythms S_{3} and S_{4}.

Heart murmurs are generated by turbulent flow of blood and a murmur to be heard as turbulent flow must require pressure difference of at least 30 mm of Hg between the chambers and the pressure dominant chamber will outflow the blood to non-dominant chamber in diseased condition which leads to Left-to-right shunt or Right-to-left shunt based on the pressure dominance. Turbulence may occur inside or outside the heart; if it occurs outside the heart then the turbulence is called bruit or vascular murmur. Murmurs may be physiological (benign) or pathological (abnormal). Abnormal murmurs can be caused by stenosis restricting the opening of a heart valve, resulting in turbulence as blood flows through it. Abnormal murmurs may also occur with valvular insufficiency (regurgitation), which allows backflow of blood when the incompetent valve closes with only partial effectiveness. Different murmurs are audible in different parts of the cardiac cycle, depending on the cause of the murmur.

== Primary heart sounds ==
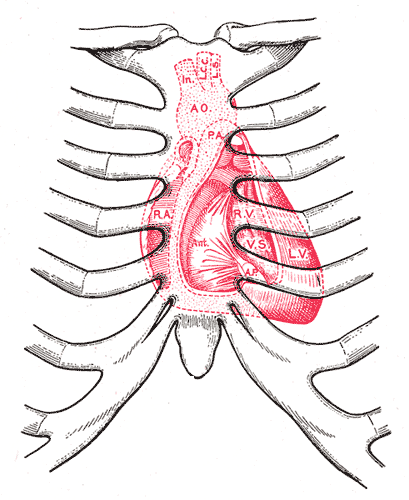
Diagram showing relations of opened heart to front of thoracic wall. Ant. Anterior segment of tricuspid valve. A O. Aorta. A.P. Anterior papillary muscle. In. Innominate artery. L.C.C. Left common carotid artery. L.S. Left subclavian artery. L.V. Left ventricle. P.A. Pulmonary artery. R.A. Right atrium. R.V. Right ventricle. V.S. Ventricular septum.

Normal heart sounds are associated with heart valves closing:

=== First heart sound ===
The first heart sound, or S_{1}, forms the "lub" of "lub-dub" and is composed of components M_{1} (mitral valve closure) and T_{1} (tricuspid valve closure). Normally M_{1} precedes T_{1} slightly. It is caused by the closure of the atrioventricular valves, i.e. tricuspid and mitral (bicuspid), at the beginning of ventricular contraction, or systole. When the ventricles begin to contract, so do the papillary muscles in each ventricle. The papillary muscles are attached to the cusps or leaflets of the tricuspid and mitral valves via chordae tendineae (heart strings). When the papillary muscles contract, the chordae tendineae become tense and thereby prevent the backflow of blood into the lower pressure environment of the atria. The chordae tendineae act a bit like the strings on a parachute, and allow the leaflets of the valve to balloon up into the atria slightly, but not so much as to evert the cusp edges and allow backflow of blood. It is the pressure created from ventricular contraction that closes the valve, not the papillary muscles themselves. The contraction of the ventricle begins just prior to AV valves closing and prior to the opening of the semilunar valves. The sudden tensing of the chordae tendineae and the squeezing of the ventricles against closed semilunar valves, send blood rushing back toward the atria, and the parachute-like valves catch the rush of blood in their leaflets causing the valve to snap shut. The S1 sound results from reverberation within the blood associated with the sudden block of flow reversal by the valves. The delay of T1 even more than normally causes the split S1 which is heard in a right bundle branch block.

=== Second heart sound ===
The second heart sound, or S_{2}, forms the "dub" of "lub-dub" and is composed of components A_{2} (aortic valve closure) and P_{2} (pulmonary valve closure). Normally A_{2} precedes P_{2} especially during inspiration where a split of S_{2} can be heard. It is caused by the closure of the semilunar valves (the aortic valve and pulmonary valve) at the end of ventricular systole and the beginning of ventricular diastole. As the left ventricle empties, its pressure falls below the pressure in the aorta. Aortic blood flow quickly reverses back toward the left ventricle, catching the pocket-like cusps of the aortic valve, and is stopped by aortic valve closure. Similarly, as the pressure in the right ventricle falls below the pressure in the pulmonary artery, the pulmonary valve closes. The S_{2} sound results from reverberation within the blood associated with the sudden block of flow reversal.

Splitting of S2, also known as physiological split, normally occurs during inhalation because the decrease in intrathoracic pressure increases the time needed for pulmonary pressure to exceed that of the right ventricular pressure. A widely split S2 can be associated with several different cardiovascular conditions, and the split is sometimes wide and variable whereas, sometimes wide and fixed. The wide and variable split occurs in Right bundle branch block, pulmonary stenosis, pulmonary hypertension and ventricular septal defects. The wide and fixed splitting of S2 occurs in atrial septal defect. Pulmonary S2 (P2) will be accentuated (loud P2) in pulmonary hypertension and pulmonary embolism. S2 becomes softer in aortic stenosis.

== Extra heart sounds ==
The rarer extra heart sounds form gallop rhythms and are heard in both normal and abnormal situations.

=== Third heart sound ===
The third heart sound, or S_{3} is rarely heard, and is also called a protodiastolic gallop, ventricular gallop, or informally the "Kentucky" gallop as an onomatopoeic reference to the rhythm and stress of S1 followed by S2 and S3 together (S1=Ken; S2=tuck; S3=y).

"lub-dub-ta" or "slosh-ing-in" If new, indicates heart failure or volume overload.

It occurs at the beginning of diastole after S2 and is lower in pitch than S1 or S2 as it is not of valvular origin. The third heart sound is benign in youth, some trained athletes, and sometimes in pregnancy but if it re-emerges later in life it may signal cardiac problems, such as a failing left ventricle as in dilated congestive heart failure (CHF). S3 is thought to be caused by the oscillation of blood back and forth between the walls of the ventricles initiated by blood rushing in from the atria. The reason the third heart sound does not occur until the middle third of diastole is probably that during the early part of diastole, the ventricles are not filled sufficiently to create enough tension for reverberation.

It may also be a result of tensing of the chordae tendineae during rapid filling and expansion of the ventricle. In other words, an S3 heart sound indicates increased volume of blood within the ventricle. An S3 heart sound is best heard with the bell-side of the stethoscope (used for lower frequency sounds). A left-sided S3 is best heard in the left lateral decubitus position and at the apex of the heart, which is normally located in the 5th left intercostal space at the midclavicular line. A right-sided S3 is best heard at the lower left sternal border. The way to distinguish between left and right-sided S3 is to observe whether it increases in intensity with inhalation or exhalation. A right-sided S3 will increase on inhalation, while a left-sided S3 will increase on exhalation.

S3 can be a normal finding in young patients but is generally pathologic over the age of 40. The most common cause of pathologic S3 is congestive heart failure.

=== Fourth heart sound ===
The fourth heart sound, or S_{4} when audible in an adult is called a presystolic gallop or atrial gallop. This gallop is produced by the sound of blood being forced into a stiff or hypertrophic ventricle.

"ta-lub-dub" or "a-stiff-wall"

It is a sign of a pathologic state, usually a failing or hypertrophic left ventricle, as in systemic hypertension, severe valvular aortic stenosis, and hypertrophic cardiomyopathy. The sound occurs just after atrial contraction at the end of diastole and immediately before S1, producing a rhythm sometimes referred to as the "Tennessee" gallop where S4 represents the "Ten-" syllable. It is best heard at the cardiac apex with the patient in the left lateral decubitus position and holding their breath. The combined presence of S3 and S4 is a quadruple gallop, also known as the "Hello-Goodbye" gallop. At rapid heart rates, S3 and S4 may merge to produce a summation gallop, sometimes referred to as S7.

Atrial contraction must be present for production of an S4. It is absent in atrial fibrillation and in other rhythms in which atrial contraction does not precede ventricular contraction.

== Murmurs ==
Phonocardiogram from normal and abnormal heart sounds.

Heart murmur
Ventricular septal defect murmur in 14 year old Rachel Morrison's heart, heard from the mitral valve area.

Mitral valve prolapse murmur
Heart sounds of a 16-year-old girl diagnosed with mitral valve prolapse and mitral regurgitation. Auscultating her heart, a systolic murmur and click are heard. Recorded with the stethoscope over the mitral valve.

Functional heart murmur
Heart sounds of a healthy young woman with a functional, physiological or "innocent" murmur. Recorded after exercise with the stethoscope placed over the pulmonic valve area.

Heart murmurs are produced as a result of turbulent flow of blood strong enough to produce audible noise. They are usually heard as a whooshing sound. The term murmur only refers to a sound believed to originate within blood flow through or near the heart; rapid blood velocity is necessary to produce a murmur. Most heart problems do not produce any murmur and most valve problems also do not produce an audible murmur.

Murmurs can be heard in many situations in adults without major congenital heart abnormalities:

- Regurgitation through the mitral valve is by far the most commonly heard murmur, producing a pansystolic/holosystolic murmur which is sometimes fairly loud to a practiced ear, even though the volume of regurgitant blood flow may be quite small. Yet, though obvious using echocardiography visualization, probably about 20% of cases of mitral regurgitation do not produce an audible murmur.
- Stenosis of the aortic valve is typically the next most common heart murmur, a systolic ejection murmur. This is more common in older adults or in those individuals having a two-leaflet, not a three-leaflet, aortic valve.
- Regurgitation through the aortic valve, if marked, is sometimes audible to a practiced ear with high quality, especially electronically amplified, stethoscope. Generally, this is a very rarely heard murmur, even though aortic valve regurgitation is not so rare. Aortic regurgitation, though obvious using echocardiography visualization, usually does not produce an audible murmur.
- Stenosis of the mitral valve, if severe, also rarely produces an audible, low frequency soft rumbling murmur, best recognized by a practiced ear using high quality, especially electronically amplified, stethoscope.
- Other audible murmurs are associated with abnormal openings between the left ventricle and right heart or from the aortic or pulmonary arteries back into a lower pressure heart chamber.

Gradations of Murmurs	(Defined based on use of an acoustic, not a high-fidelity amplified electronic stethoscope)
Grade	Description
Grade 1	Very faint, heard only after listener has "tuned in"; may not be heard in all positions. Only heard if the patient "bears down" or performs the Valsalva maneuver.
Grade 2	Quiet, but heard immediately after placing the stethoscope on the chest.
Grade 3	Moderately loud.
Grade 4	Loud, with palpable thrill (a tremor or vibration felt on palpation)
Grade 5	Very loud, with thrill. May be heard when stethoscope is partly off the chest.
Grade 6	Very loud, with thrill. May be heard with stethoscope entirely off the chest.

Though several different cardiac conditions can cause heart murmurs, the murmurs can change markedly with the severity of the cardiac disease. An astute physician can sometimes diagnose cardiac conditions with some accuracy based largely on the murmur, related physical examination, and experience with the relative frequency of different heart conditions. However, with the advent of better quality and wider availability of echocardiography and other techniques, heart status can be recognized and quantified much more accurately than formerly possible with only a stethoscope, examination, and experience. Another advantage to the use of the echocardiogram is that the devices can be handheld.

=== Effects of breathing ===
Heartbeat while holding breath
Heart sounds of a 16-year-old girl with mitral regurgitation holding her breath.

Inhalation decreases intrathoracic pressure which allows more venous blood to return to the right heart (pulling blood into the right side of the heart via a vacuum-like effect). Therefore, right-sided heart murmurs generally increase in intensity with inhalation. The decreased (more negative) intrathoracic pressure has an opposite effect on the left side of the heart, making it harder for the blood to exit into circulation. Therefore, left-sided murmurs generally decrease in intensity during inhalation. Increasing venous blood return to the right side of the heart by raising a patient's legs to a 45-degree while lying supine produces similar effect which occurs during inhalation. Inhalation can also produce a non-pathological split S2 which will be heard upon auscultation.

With exhalation, the opposite haemodynamic changes occur: left-sided murmurs generally increase in intensity with exhalation.

=== Interventions that change murmurs ===
There are a number of interventions that can be performed that alter the intensity and characteristics of abnormal heart sounds. These interventions can differentiate the different heart sounds to more effectively obtain a diagnosis of the cardiac anomaly that causes the heart sound.

== Other abnormal sounds ==
Clicks – Heart clicks are short, high-pitched sounds that can be appreciated with modern non-invasive imaging techniques.

Rubs – The pericardial friction rub can be heard in pericarditis, an inflammation of the pericardium, the sac surrounding the heart. This is a characteristic scratching, creaking, high-pitched sound emanating from the rubbing of both layers of inflamed pericardium. It is the loudest in systole, but can often be heard at the beginning and at the end of diastole. It is very dependent on body position and breathing, and changes from hour to hour.

== Surface anatomy ==
The aortic area, pulmonic area, tricuspid area and mitral area are areas on the surface of the chest where the heart is auscultated. Heart sounds result from reverberation within the blood associated with the sudden block of flow reversal by the valves closing. Because of this, auscultation to determine function of a valve is usually not performed at the position of the valve, but at the position to where the sound waves reverberate.

Aortic valve (to aorta)	right second intercostal space	upper right sternal border
Pulmonary valve (to pulmonary trunk)	left second intercostal space	upper left sternal border
Erb's point	Left third intercostal space	left sternal border
Tricuspid valve (to right ventricle)	left fourth, fifth intercostal spaces	lower left sternal border
Mitral valve (to left ventricle)	left fifth intercostal space	left midclavicular line

== Recording heart sounds ==
Using electronic stethoscopes, it is possible to record heart sounds via direct output to an external recording device, such as a laptop or MP3 recorder. The same connection can be used to listen to the previously recorded auscultation through the stethoscope headphones, allowing for a more detailed study of murmurs and other heart sounds, for general research as well as evaluation of a particular patient's condition.

== See also ==
- Pulse
- Precordial examination
- Benign pediatric heart murmur
- Iambic pentameter, a metre in poetry that follows a similar rhythm to the human heartbeat
- Pulsatile tinnitus – hearing a heartbeat sound in one or both ears
- Souffle (heart sound)
