= John Brereton Barlow =

South African cardiologist (1924–2008)

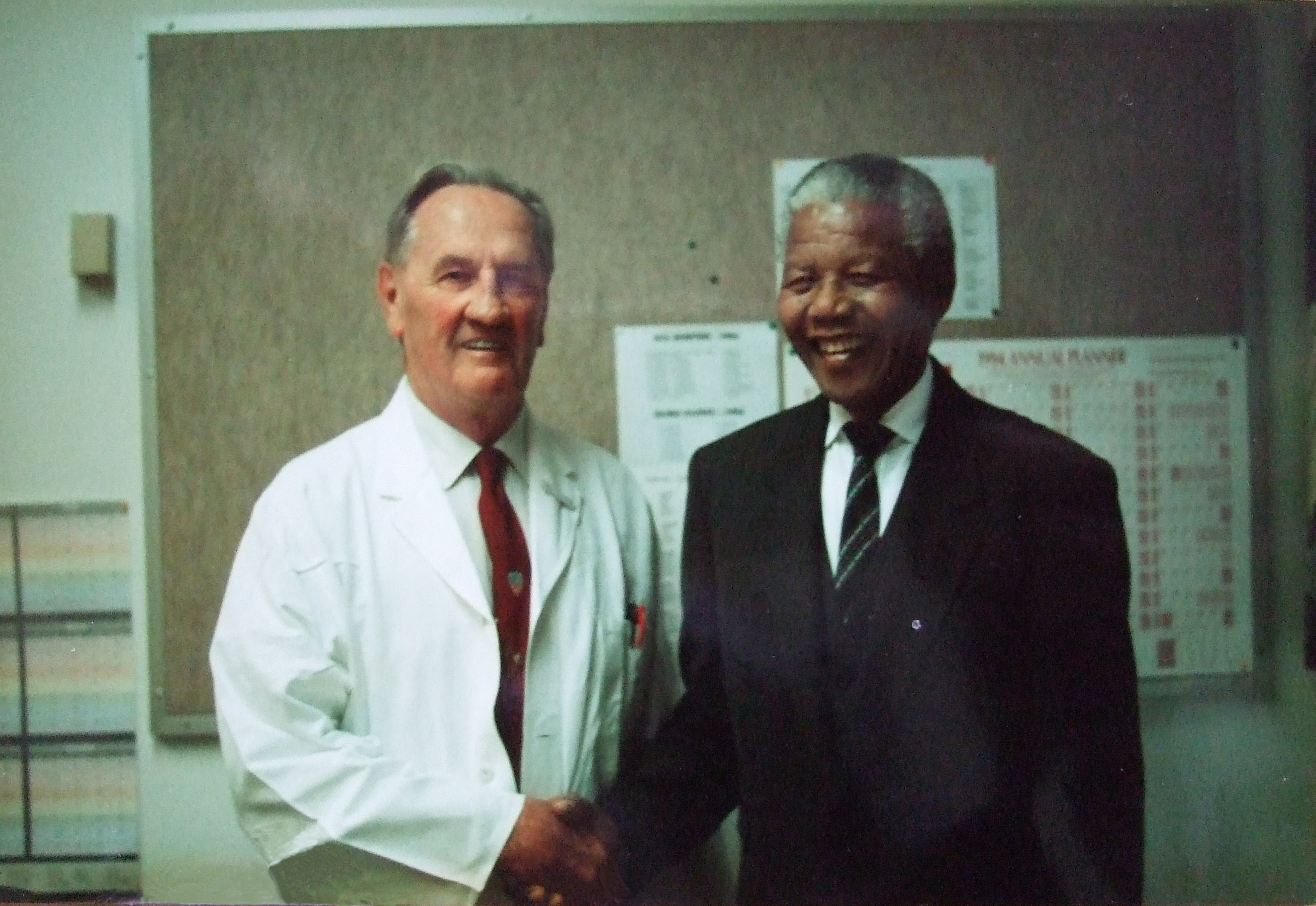
- John Barlow with Nelson Mandela
- Born: 24 October 1924; Johannesburg, Union of South Africa
- Died: 10 December 2008 (aged 84); Johannesburg, Republic of South Africa
- Education: University of the Witwatersrand; Hammersmith Hospital; Royal Postgraduate Medical School
- Years active: 1951–2008
- Known for: Mitral valve research Barlow's Syndrome
- Medical career
- Profession: Physician
- Institutions: Royal Imperial Hospital, Baragwanath; Johannesburg Hospital
- Sub-specialties: Cardiology

John Brereton Barlow (24 October 1924 – 10 December 2008) was a world-renowned South African cardiologist. He qualified as a doctor in 1951, gained experience as a registrar in Hammersmith Hospital and the Royal Postgraduate Medical School in London. In the late 1950s he returned to South Africa to Johannesburg Hospital where he became Professor of Cardiology in the research unit and carried out significant studies on cardiac disorders as well as discovering the cause of a well known mitral valve disorder.

He gives his name to Barlow's Syndrome.

== Professional life ==
Barlow commenced medical studies at the University of the Witwatersrand. However, shortly afterwards, in 1940 when South Africa became involved in World War II he enlisted in the military and spent time attached to British forces in North Africa and later the Fifth US Army in Italy. He returned to medical school in 1946 and graduated with MBBCh. in November 1951.

Barlow served his internship and registrar posts in the Royal Imperial Hospital, Baragwanath Hospital and in 1955 set sail for England to sit his examination for membership of the Royal College of Physicians. He worked as SHO to Sheila Sherlock and medical registrar under Mr John McMichael at Hammersmith Hospital and The Royal Post Graduate Medical School in London. It was during this time that Barlow became interested in auscultation and phonocardiography which led him to investigate non-ejection clicks and late systolic murmurs. The non-ejection click had long been thought to have an origin outside the heart. During his time at the Royal Postgraduate Medical School Barlow attended the postmortem examination of a patient who was known to have a 'click'. Barlow noticed that the man had a single fibrosed mitral valve chord, he also noted no abnormality outside the heart to account for the click. Barlow, by further investigation, was able to demonstrate that the cause of this widely known but little-understood problem was due to a pathological condition of the mitral valve. This discovery by Barlow was controversial at the time and was met with skepticism by the cardiological community. His first paper on the subject was declined because his assertions were extreme. A friend and former colleague persuaded Barlow to submit a shorter version of the paper to the Maryland State Medical Journal (of which his friend was a sub-editor) where it was published under the title "The Significance of Late Systolic Murmurs and Mid-Late Systolic Clicks". A second and ground-breaking paper was published in the American Heart Journal in October 1963. So significant was this paper that it became one of the most commonly cited papers in the AHJ and in 1983 was designated by the Institute for Scientific Information as a citation classic. In addition to his specialised work on the mitral valve, he furthered research and published papers in other cardiac pathologies including the role of tricuspid regurgitation after mitral valve surgery; the role of a haemodynamic valve load as the origin of refractory heart failure in patients with active carditis; submitral aneurysm; hypertrophic cardiomyopathy and the time course of "false positive stress ECGs"

In the late 1950s, Barlow returned to South Africa to work at Johannesburg Hospital as a registrar. In 1960, he became a consultant physician in the cardiac research unit, in 1971 he was appointed director of the cardiology unit and named his newly commissioned cardiac catheterization unit the McMichael Unit in honour of his erstwhile mentor. In 1972, together with Margaret McClaren and others, he carried out a study on 12,000 schoolchildren of Soweto which demonstrated very high levels of rheumatic heart disease. When the paper was published in the British Medical Journal the international publicity highlighted the poor socio-economic conditions of the children living under the laws of apartheid, the South African government was critical of the study. In 1980 he was awarded a Professorship of Cardiology,(Ad Hominem) and continued in this post for a further 10 years to his retirement.

Barlow was widely acknowledged by his peers as an excellent clinician who put great store into taking a careful medical history and a thorough physical examination. He tended not to trust medical tests and questioned medical orthodoxy in general. He treated people from all walks of life, from poor children from Soweto to President Nelson Mandela. Later in his career he found maintaining standards more difficult as other consultants either emigrated or moved to the private medicine sector, but even after his retirement he continued to support, advise, consult and supervise until a few months before his death.

Barlow had a deserved international reputation for his knowledge of cardiac problems, specifically those associated with murmurs of the mitral valve. He described the development and mechanism of the 'click' and murmur and showed that they were caused by prolapse or billowing of the valve and mitral regurgitation respectively. He also described other pathological conditions of the mitral valve including associated regurgitation, abnormal changes of rhythms and associated abnormal electrocardiograph readings. In 1968 Barlow and Wendy Pocock co-authored a paper published by the British Heart Journal

== Bibliography ==
Perspectives on the Mitral Valve F.A. Davis Company, Philadelphia, 1986. ISBN 0-8036-0617-6.

The dedication reads —

"To all the students who listen, look, touch and reflect: may they hear, see, feel and comprehend"

== Personal life ==
John Barlow was the son of Lancelot White Barlow, a South African who studied medicine in England and returned to South Africa to work as a medical pathologist. His mother was Madeline Dicks who Lancelot met while studying medicine. Educated at St John's College (Johannesburg, South Africa), where he excelled as a sportsman - especially in rugby. He had a reputation for flouting the rules. As a medical student he was fond of referring to rare or bizarre medical conditions, this earned him the nickname 'Canary' alluding to the fact that canaries are rare in South Africa, Later Barlow, in a tribute to this name (and his eccentricity) kept canaries outside his office.

Barlow married Shelagh Cox in 1949 and they had two sons, Richard John and Clifford William who are medical consultants in dermatology and cardio-thoracic surgery respectively and working in the United Kingdom.

== Awards ==
Among many local and international awards made to John Barlow are the following:

- Walter Bleifield Award for Distinguished Contribution in the Field of Clinical Research in Clinical Cardiology from the International Society of Heart Failure.
- Louis and Artur Lucian Award for Outstanding Research in the Field of Diseases of the Circulation from McGill University in Montreal.
- First Recipient of Award for Distinguished Contributions to National and International Cardiology from the South African Cardiac Society in Johannesburg.
- Percy Fox Foundation National Award for Outstanding Work as an Internationally Recognized Authority in Cardiology.
- Annual Laennec Society Lectureship from the American Heart Association.
- Annual St Cyres Lectureship, National Heart Hospital in London and British Cardiac Society.
- André Allard Medal for Distinguished Service to Medicine from the International Academy of Aviation and Space Medicine.
- The Seymour Lectureship and Medal for Distinguished Service to International Medicine from Wesley Medical Center, Wichita, Kansas.
- President's Medal for Distinguished Contributions to International Cardiology from the National Council of the South Africa Cardiac Society.
- Honorary Research Fellowship from the University of Witwatersrand, Johannesburg.
