= Shone's syndrome =

- Other names: Shone's complex, Shone's anomaly, or Shone's disease
- Specialty: Cardiology

Shone's syndrome is a rare congenital heart defect described by Shone in 1963. In the complete form, four left-sided defects are present:

- Supravalvular mitral membrane (SVMM)
- Parachute mitral valve
- Subaortic stenosis (membranous or muscular)
- Coarctation of the aorta

Of these four defects, supravalvular mitral membrane (SVMM) is the first to occur and triggers the development of the other three defects. Partial complexes, or forme fruste, have also been described. The definition is often expanded to include lesions of the left side of the heart not originally ascribed to Shone's syndrome, including mitral and aortic valvular lesions and supravalvular aortic stenosis.

The term parachute mitral valve stems from the morphological appearance of the valve; that is to say, the mitral valve leaflets appear as the canopy of the parachute, the chordae as the strings and the papillary muscle as the harness.

== Presentation ==
Shone’s syndrome is a rare disorder that is often detected in very young children. The children tend to show symptoms like fatigue, nocturnal cough, and reduced cardiac output by the age of two years. They also develop wheezing due to the exudation of fluid into the lungs.

== Mechanism ==
In the normal human heart, there are two mitral valve leaflets, each with its own set of chordae. However, in the case of the parachute mitral valve, the chordae insert on only one papillary muscle instead of two distinct papillary muscles. Often, the chordae are short and thick, which can cause restricted movement of the mitral valve leaflets and obstruct the blood flow into the left ventricle.

The supramitral ring is a connective tissue ring at the base of the atrial surfaces of the mitral valve leaflets. They may protrude into the orifice of the mitral valve, leading to fixed obstruction of blood flow from the left atria to the left ventricles.

Subaortic stenosis has been observed in both muscular and membranous forms. In either case, a variable degree of obstruction may be observed at the ventricular surface of the aortic valve. This presents an obstruction of flow of blood from the ventricle to the aorta.

Coarctation of the aorta which is, narrowing of a section of the aorta may also be observed. Again this presents an obstruction to blood flow out from the left ventricle.

Since there is obstruction of flow into and out of the left ventricle, the prognosis depends on the degree of obstruction and its effect on blood flow.

== Diagnosis ==
Cardiac magnetic resonance imaging is best suited to evaluate patients with Shone's syndrome. Routine blood tests should be done prior to cardiac catheterization. The surgeons will repair the mitral valve and partially remove the supramitral ring. This surgical method is preferred to a valve replacement procedure.

Classifying cardiac lesions in infants is quite difficult, and accurate diagnosis is essential. The diagnosis of Shone’s syndrome requires an ultrasound of the heart (echocardiogram) and a cardiac catheterization procedure, that is, insertion of a device through blood vessels in the groin to the heart that helps identify heart anatomy.

== Treatment ==
When treated early, that is, before the onset of pulmonary hypertension, a good outcome is possible in patients with Shone’s syndrome. However, other surgical methods can be employed depending upon the patient’s medical background. The single most important determinant of poor outcome during the surgical management of patients with Shone's syndrome is the degree of involvement of the mitral valve and the presence of secondary pulmonary hypertension.
