= Trabeculae carneae =

Muscular columns found in the heart

Details

Identifiers
- Latin: trabeculae carneae cordis
- TA98: A12.1.00.020
- FMA: 76525

The trabeculae carneae (columnae carneae or meaty ridges) are rounded or irregular muscular columns which project from the inner surface of the right and left ventricle of the heart. These are different from the pectinate muscles, which are present in the atria of the heart. In development, trabeculae carneae are among the first of the cardiac structures to develop in the embryonic cardiac tube. Throughout development some trabeculae carneae condense to form the myocardium, papillary muscles, chordae tendineae, and septum.

== Types ==
There are two kinds:

- Some are attached along their entire length on one side and merely form prominent ridges.
- Others are fixed at their extremities but free in the middle, as in the moderator band in the right ventricle, or the papillary muscles that holds chordae tendinae, which are connected to cusps of valves to control flow of blood into the heart.

== Function ==
Trabeculae lie at the interface between intracardiac flow and the compact myocardium. Their fractal branching pattern helps to maintain cardiac performance in both healthy and failing hearts by increasing contractility and stroke work. Trabecular morphology is also important to intraventricular conduction, suggesting these complex structures are involved in cardiac electrophysiology as well as mechanical function. A condensation of trabecular fibres forms the moderator band which carries the right branch of the bundle of His.

The trabeculae carneae also serve a function similar to that of papillary muscles in that their contraction pulls on the chordae tendineae, preventing inversion of the mitral (bicuspid) and tricuspid valves towards the atrial chambers, which would lead to subsequent leakage of the blood back into the atria. By this action on the atrioventricular valves, backflow of the blood from the ventricles into the atria is prevented.

The trabeculae carneae and the papillary muscles make up a significant percentage of the ventricular mass in the heart (12-17% in normal human adult hearts), and are correlated with ventricular end diastolic volume. Trabeculae ratios of capillary-to myocyte differ between the walls of the right and left ventricle. In the left ventricle, each capillary delivers oxygen to one myocyte. However, in the right ventricle the capillary-to myocyte ratio is 0.8 because the right ventricle tissues have a lower oxygen consumption due to a weaker afterload.

== See also ==
- Trabecula
