= Parachute mitral valve =

Congenital heart disease

Parachute Mitral Valve with associated Mitral Stenosis

Parachute mitral valve (or PMV) is a rare congenital heart disease where the mitral valve only has a single papillary muscle from which all chordae tendineae originate. It is caused by an embryologic failure of papillary muscles to divide into two normally distinct columns, giving the mitral valve orifice and chordea an irregular, parachute-like appearance. Due to the abnormal anatomy, there are almost always associated mitral valve disorders, and because of its abnormal embryologic origin, PMV almost always coincides in a complex of other congenital heart defects. PMV is usually identified during infancy or childhood due to its symptomatic nature, and hardly ever diagnosed during adulthood.

== Clinical significance ==
=== Associated mitral valve disease ===
As a result of the thickened and shortened chordae, there is a restriction of the inflow of blood to mitral valve annulus and subannulus causing a narrowing known as mitral stenosis which increases the pressure gradient through the valve. Also, abnormal closure of the mitral valve leaflets or mitral valve prolapse will cause the valve significantly leak during closure known as mitral valve insufficiency.

Parachute mitral valve is commonly associated with other congenital heart disease. A 2004 study finds that children with PMV are 68% likely to have aortic coarctation, 54% likely to have an atrial septal defect, 46% likely to have a ventricular septal defect, and 19% likely to have left ventricular hypoplasia. Parachute mitral valve is also a part of the congenital complex of Shone's Syndrome.

Unfortunately, the overall outcome of the children diagnosed with parachute mitral valve especially with the other likely multilevel left-heart diseases is only somewhat satisfactory. However, with increasingly improved technology for mitral valve reconstructions, repairs and replacements procedures, outcomes are expected to improve in the future.
