= J. Michael Criley =

American cardiologist (1931–2026)

John Michael Criley
- Born: May 23, 1931
- Died: June 15, 2026 (aged 95)
- Education: BS, 1953, Stanford University; MD, 1956, Stanford University School of Medicine
- Known for: Mitral valve research Mitral valve prolapse Cough CPR
- Medical career
- Institutions: David Geffen School of Medicine at UCLA, The Lundquist Institute
- Sub-specialties: Cardiology

John Michael Criley (May 23, 1931 – June 15, 2026) was an American cardiologist who was Professor at the David Geffen School of Medicine at University of California, Los Angeles (UCLA).

== Life and career ==
Criley made a number of pioneering contributions to the field of cardiology and medical education of the physical examination. He was also instrumental in the development of the Los Angeles County Fire Department's Paramedic program in 1969.

He was an authority on cardiac hemodynamics, cardiac auscultation, cardiac catheterization, and valvular heart disease. He served for 25 years as Division Chief at Harbor-UCLA Medical Center in Torrance, California.

In addition, he is also credited with the term mitral valve prolapse, after demonstrating to Dr. Barlow that it was not aneurysm of the mitral leaflet but rather displacement of the leaflet that led to the condition.

Criley died on June 15, 2026, at the age of 95.
