= Heart click =

- Differential diagnosis: mitral stenosis, mitral valve prolapse

With newer, non-invasive imaging techniques, the origin of other, so-called adventitial sounds or heart clicks has been appreciated. These are short, high-pitched sounds.

- The mitral valve in cases of mitral stenosis may open with an opening snap on the beginning of diastole.
- Patients with mitral valve prolapse may have a mid-systolic click along with a murmur, referred to as apical late systolic murmur. Early systolic clicks may also be present in some patients.
- Aortic and pulmonary stenosis may cause an ejection click immediately after S_{1}.
