= Mitral annular disjunction =

Medical condition

Coronal view of heart with labeled mitral valve in yellow

Mitral annular disjunction (MAD) is a structural abnormality of the heart in the mitral annulus ring. It is generally defined as an abnormal displacement of the location of where the posterior mitral valve leaflet inserts onto the left atrial wall and the left ventricular wall. This abnormal attachment allows for the mitral valve to become hypermobile and can result in ventricular arrhythmias.

== History ==
MAD was first described in 1986 through autopsy analysis of hearts while investigating the incidence of mitral valve prolapse. Early work noted that patients who died suddenly often had an abnormal separation of the mitral annulus from the ventricular myocardium.

== Pathophysiology ==
The cause of MAD is not well understood. Hypotheses of congenital, degenerative, and acquired structural abnormalities exist. However, the physical characteristics of MAD are able to be observed through a variety of cardiac imaging techniques. Normally the posterior aspect of the mitral annulus is attached to the posterior aspect of the left ventricular wall. In MAD, there is a distinct separation between the mitral annular ring and left ventricular wall. During systole, contraction of the ventricle, the mitral valve leaflet moves away from the ventricular wall and does not move as synchronously as in a heart without MAD. The degree of disjunction can range from a few millimeters to great than 10 millimeters. This abnormal motion is thought to exacerbate mechanical stress on the mitral valve apparatus, promoting myxomatous degeneration and leaflet redundancy. The resulting hyper-mobility may predispose the left ventricle—especially the inferolateral wall and papillary muscles—to stretch-induced fibrosis, which is believed to be an important substrate for ventricular arrhythmias in a mechanism described as the “Padua hypothesis.”

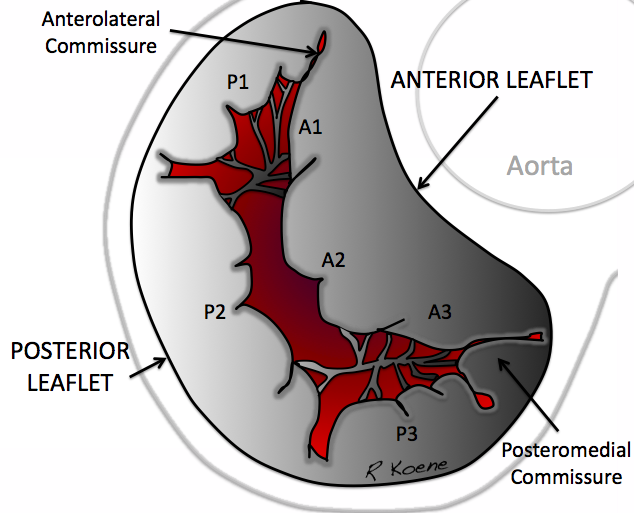
Transverse view of mitral valve with labeled posterior valve leaflet

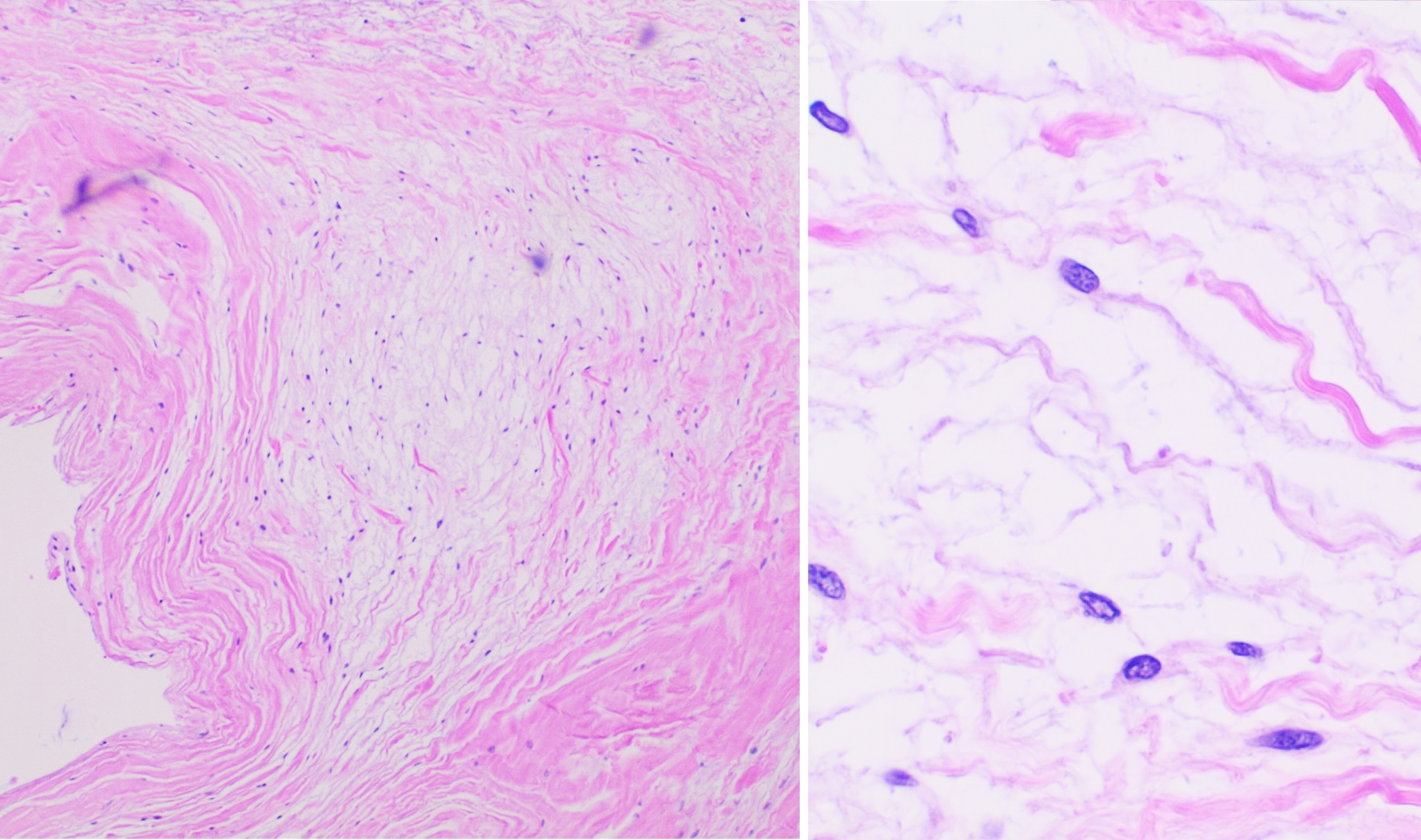
Histopathology of mitral valve with myxomatous degeneration

== Diagnosis ==
MAD can be found in approximately 30% of patients with mitral valve prolapse, which affects 1-3% of the population. The condition is reported to be more common in women and typically presents as chest pain.

MAD can be diagnosed with echocardiography. Additionally, it can also be diagnosed by cardiac computed tomography and cardiac MRI.
