= Mitral valve prolapse =

Abnormally-thickened heart valve

- Other names: Floppy mitral valve syndrome, systolic click murmur syndrome, billowing mitral leaflet, Barlow's syndrome
- In mitral valve prolapse, the leaflets of the mitral valve prolapse back into the left atrium.
- Specialty: Cardiology
- Symptoms: Palpitations, atypical precordial pain, dyspnea on exertion, low BMI, electrocardiogram abnormalities (ventricular tachycardia), syncope, low blood pressure, headaches, lightheadedness, other signs suggestive of autonomic nervous system dysfunction (dysautonomia)
- Complications: Mitral regurgitation
- Duration: Lifelong
- Risk factors: Ehlers-Danlos syndrome, Marfan syndrome, polycystic kidney disease, Graves disease, and chest wall deformities such as pectus excavatum
- Diagnostic method: Echocardiogram, auscultation
- Frequency: 1 in 40 people; 2–3% of total population in the United States; 3.36% in a Taiwanese military study

Mitral valve prolapse murmur at mitral area
Heart sounds of a 16-year-old girl diagnosed with mitral valve prolapse and mitral regurgitation. Auscultating her heart, a systolic murmur and click are heard. Recorded with the stethoscope over the mitral valve.

Mitral valve prolapse murmur at tricuspid area
Her heart sounds while holding her breath. Recorded with the stethoscope over the tricuspid valve.

Mitral valve prolapse murmur at tricuspid area after exercising
Her heart sounds during recovery after running. Recorded with the stethoscope over the tricuspid valve.

Mitral valve prolapse (MVP) is a valvular heart disease characterized by the displacement of an abnormally thickened mitral valve leaflet into the left atrium during systole. It is the primary form of myxomatous degeneration of the valve. There are various types of MVP, broadly classified as classic and nonclassic. In severe cases of classic MVP, complications include mitral regurgitation, infective endocarditis, congestive heart failure, and, in rare circumstances, cardiac arrest.

The diagnosis of MVP primarily relies on echocardiography, which uses ultrasound to visualize the mitral valve.

MVP is the most common valvular abnormality, and is estimated to affect 2–3% of the population and 1 in 40 people might have it.

The condition was first described by John Brereton Barlow in 1966. It was subsequently termed mitral valve prolapse by J. Michael Criley. Although mid-systolic click (the sound produced by the prolapsing mitral leaflet) and systolic murmur associated with MVP were observed as early as 1887 by physicians M. Cuffer and M. Barbillon using a stethoscope.

== Signs and symptoms ==
=== Murmur ===
Upon auscultation of an individual with mitral valve prolapse, a mid-systolic click, followed by a late systolic murmur heard best at the apex, is common. The length of the murmur signifies the time period over which blood is leaking back into the left atrium, known as regurgitation. A murmur that lasts throughout the whole of systole is known as a holo-systolic murmur. A murmur that is mid to late systolic, although typically associated with less regurgitation, can still be associated with significant hemodynamic consequences.

In contrast to most other heart murmurs, the murmur of mitral valve prolapse is accentuated by standing and Valsalva maneuver (earlier systolic click and longer murmur) and diminished with squatting (later systolic click and shorter murmur). The only other heart murmur that follows this pattern is the murmur of hypertrophic cardiomyopathy. An MVP murmur can be distinguished from a hypertrophic cardiomyopathy murmur by the presence of a mid-systolic click which is virtually diagnostic of MVP. The handgrip maneuver diminishes the murmur of an MVP and the murmur of hypertrophic cardiomyopathy. The handgrip maneuver also diminishes the duration of the murmur and delays the timing of the mid-systolic click.

Both Valsalva maneuver and standing decrease venous return to the heart thereby decreasing left ventricular diastolic filling (preload) and causing more laxity on the chordae tendineae. This allows the mitral valve to prolapse earlier in systole, leading to an earlier systolic click (i.e. closer to S_{1}), and a longer murmur.

=== Mitral valve prolapse syndrome ===
Historically, the term mitral valve prolapse syndrome has been applied to MVP associated with palpitations, atypical precordial pain, dyspnea on exertion, low body mass index, and electrocardiogram abnormalities (ventricular tachycardia), syncope, low blood pressure, headaches, lightheadedness, exercise intolerance, gastrointestinal disturbances, cold extremities and other signs suggestive of autonomic nervous system dysfunction (dysautonomia).

=== Mitral regurgitation ===
Mitral valve prolapse can result in mitral regurgitation, shown here, in which blood abnormally flows from the left ventricle (1) back into the left atrium (2).

Mitral valve prolapse is frequently associated with mild mitral regurgitation, where blood aberrantly flows from the left ventricle into the left atrium during systole. In the United States, MVP is the most common cause of severe, non-ischemic mitral regurgitation. This is occasionally due to rupture of the chordae tendineae that support the mitral valve.

The severity of regurgitation in MVP is typically estimated using a grading system:

- 0 (none or trivial)
- Grade 1 (mild)
- Grade 2 (moderate)
- Grade 3 (moderate to severe)
- Grade 4 (severe)

=== Cardiac arrhythmia ===
People with mitral valve prolapse might have arrhythmic mitral valve prolapse which includes higher incidence of ventricular contraction disorders and tachycardia compared to the normal population, although the relationship between both phenomena is not entirely clear. Prolapse of both mitral leaflets and the presence of mitral regurgitation further increases the risk of severe ventricular arrhythmias during exertion, which may not be resolved with surgery. The most common rhythm disorder is ventricular extrasystole, followed by paroxysmal atrial tachycardia.

=== Sudden cardiac death ===
Severe mitral valve prolapse and moderate-to-severe mitral regurgitation and reduced left ventricular ejection fraction is associated with arrhythmias and atrial fibrillation that can progress to cardiac arrest and sudden cardiac death (SCD). Because there is no evidence that prolapse has contributed to these arrhythmias, these complications may be due to mitral regurgitation or congestive heart failure. The incidence of life-threatening arrhythmias in the general population with MVP remain low. Sudden cardiac death results in 0.2% to 0.4% patients per year.

== Risk factors ==
MVP can be non-syndromic, isolated, familial and syndromic. The syndromic variant may occur with greater frequency in individuals with Ehlers-Danlos syndrome, Marfan syndrome, Loeys–Dietz syndrome, Williams–Beuren syndrome or polycystic kidney disease. Other risk factors include Graves' disease and chest wall deformities such as pectus excavatum. For unknown reasons, MVP patients tend to have a low body mass index (BMI) and are typically leaner than individuals without MVP. Also women tend to have joint hypermobility.

Rheumatic fever is common worldwide and responsible for many cases of damaged heart valves. Chronic rheumatic heart disease is characterized by repeated inflammation with fibrinous resolution. The cardinal anatomic changes of the valve include leaflet thickening, commissural fusion, and shortening and thickening of the tendinous cords. The recurrence of rheumatic fever is relatively common in the absence of maintenance of low dose antibiotics, especially during the first three to five years after the first episode. Heart complications may be long-term and severe, particularly if valves are involved. Rheumatic fever, since the advent of routine penicillin administration for Strep throat, has become less common in developed countries. In the older generation and in much of the less-developed world, valvular disease (including mitral valve prolapse, reinfection in the form of valvular endocarditis, and valve rupture) from undertreated rheumatic fever continues to be a problem.

In an Indian hospital between 2004 and 2005, 4 of 24 endocarditis patients failed to demonstrate classic vegetations. All had rheumatic heart disease (RHD) and presented with prolonged fever. All had severe eccentric mitral regurgitation (MR). (One had severe aortic regurgitation (AR) also.) One had flail posterior mitral leaflet (PML).

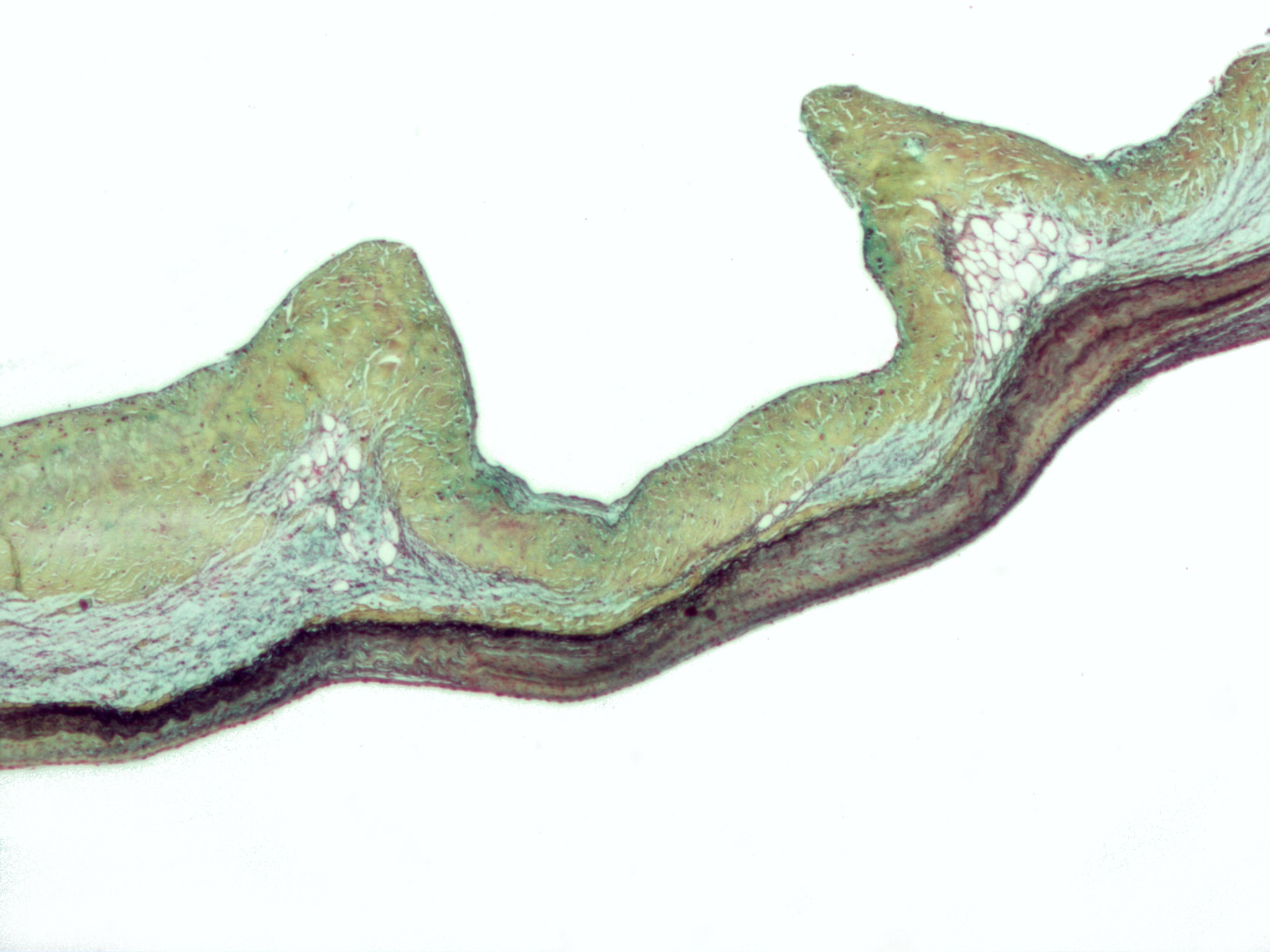
Micrograph demonstrating thickening of the spongiosa layer (blue) in myxomatous degeneration of the aortic valve. Movat's stain.

The mitral valve, so named because of its resemblance to a bishop's mitre, is the heart valve that prevents the backflow of blood from the left ventricle into the left atrium of the heart. It is composed of two leaflets, one anterior and one posterior, that close when the left ventricle contracts.

Each leaflet is composed of three layers of tissue: the atrialis, fibrosa, and spongiosa. Patients with classic mitral valve prolapse have excess connective tissue that thickens the spongiosa and separates collagen bundles in the fibrosa. This is due to an excess of dermatan sulfate, a glycosaminoglycan. This weakens the leaflets and adjacent tissue, resulting in increased leaflet area and elongation of the chordae tendineae. Elongation of the chordae tendineae often causes rupture, commonly to the chordae attached to the posterior leaflet. Advanced lesions—also commonly involving the posterior leaflet—lead to leaflet folding, inversion, and displacement toward the left atrium.

=== In diagnostics ===
Common risk factors in diagnostics for severe, arrhythmic mitral valve prolapse include:

- Electrocardiography – Inferior T wave inversions in II, III, aVF leads, ST-segment depression, QT dispersion, QT prolongation, complex ventricular ectopy (PVCs), PVC-triggered ventricular fibrillation
- Echocardiography – moderate mitral regurgitation, leaflet thickening, bi-leaflet MVP with redundancy, spiked systolic high-velocity signal (pickelhaube spike) when ≥ 16 cm/s in mitral annular tissue Doppler imaging (TDI), mitral annular disjunction (MAD)
- Cardiac MRI – myocardial/papillary scars (fibrosis), myocardial stretch, systolic curling

== Histopathology ==
MVP is understood histologically, as a form of myxomatous degeneration, which is a type of connective tissue changes.

In MVP, the spongiosa layer of the mitral valve leaflets undergoes proliferation, and the cells in this layer multiply and expand. This proliferation is associated with the accumulation of deposits of mucopolysaccharide, which have a high water content, which leads to an increase in the thickness and redundancy (excess tissue) of the leaflets of the mitral valve.

Also in people with MVP, there is an increase in the content of type III collagen, a protein that provides structure and strength to tissues. At the same time, the elastin fibers, which provide elasticity to the tissues, become fragmented. This combination of changes contributes to the overall structural alterations observed in MVP.

== Causes ==
=== Genetics ===
Mitral valve prolapse is a genetically heterogeneous autosomal dominant trait, which can be passed down from one parent to child, who will have a 50% chance to inherit the mutated gene.

Research has shown an association between MVP and primary cilia defects. Studies have identified mutations in the Zinc finger protein DZIP1 gene which regulates ciliogenesis; the same problem was found in mice who also developed MVP with this gene. It was found that primary cilia loss during development results in progressive myxomatous degeneration and profound mitral valve pathology.

Myxomatous degeneration of the mitral valve is a genetic abnormality that is mapped to the Xq28 gene. And additionally to FLNA.

To date, only one of the genes that have been associated with MVP is a direct regulator of connective tissue maintenance and extracellular matrix composition: TLL1, in a gain-of-function mechanism.

Other genes that have been associated with MVP include:

- 13.q31.3-q32.1
- 16p12.1-p11.2
- Ch16p11.2-p12.1
- 11p15.4
- DCHS1

Genetic and chromosome defect causes of MVP are complex and currently not fully understood. Further research is needed to fully identify all of the genes and genetic mechanisms involved in the development of MVP.

=== Other ===
Recent studies have suggested an association between MVP and the upregulation of 5HTR2B expression. This upregulation is associated with increased serotonin (5HT) receptor signaling which is involved in the remodeling of the mitral valve prolapse. The researchers also found that blocking 5HTR2B can reduce mitral valve interstitial cells (MVIC) activation in vitro and MV remodeling in vivo. Suggesting that 5HT receptor signaling plays a role in the pathological remodeling of MVP.

Withdrawn drug such as benfluorex stimulated serotonergic pathways, which lead to valve degeneration with increased valve interstitial cell proliferation resulting in increased rate of valvular pathologies in people taking the drug.

In a 2023 study a potential link between the use of SSRIs and the development of mitral valve regurgitation was found. Findings suggest that SSRIs may accelerate degenerative mitral valve regurgitation (DMR), particularly in people with a specific 5-HTTLPR genotype ('long-long'). The researchers recommend genotyping DMR patients to assess serotonin transporter (SERT) activity and advocate for caution in prescribing SSRIs to those with a family history of DMR.

== Diagnosis ==
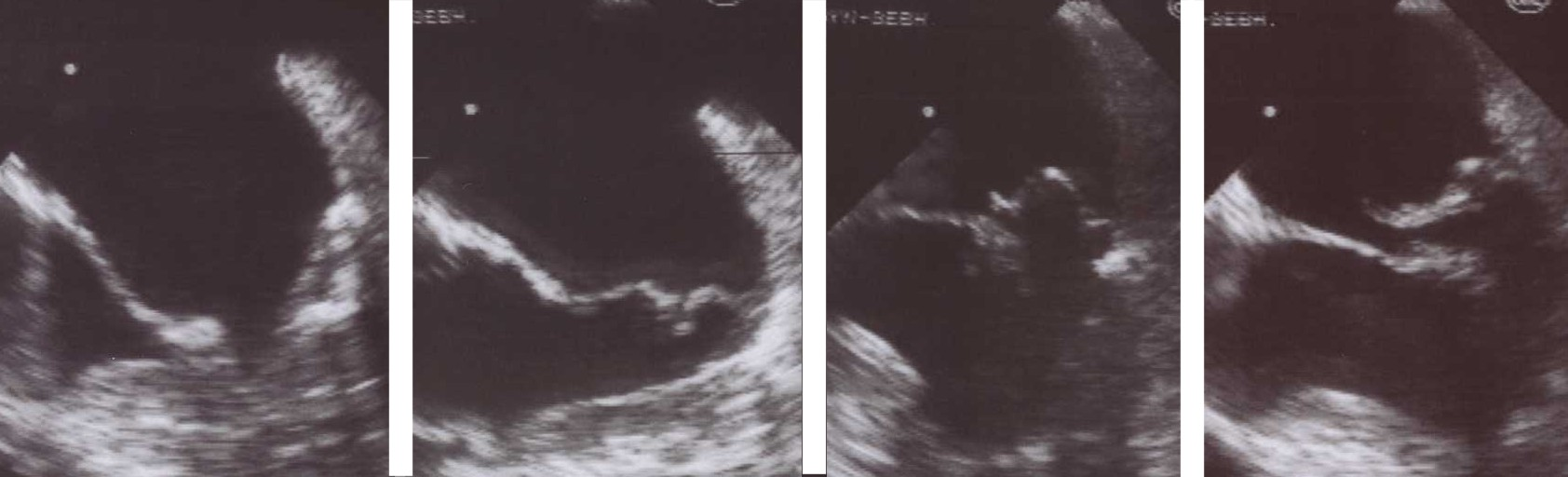
Transesophageal echocardiogram of mitral valve prolapse.

Mitral valve prolapse classification. Diagnosis of mitral valve prolapse is based on modern echocardiographic techniques which can pinpoint abnormal leaflet thickening and other related pathology.

Echocardiography is the most useful method of diagnosing a prolapsed mitral valve. Two- and three-dimensional echocardiography is particularly valuable as they allow visualization of the mitral leaflets relative to the mitral annulus. This allows measurement of the leaflet thickness and their displacement relative to the annulus. Thickening of the mitral leaflets >5 mm and leaflet displacement >2 mm above the annular plane in parasternal long-axis view indicates classic mitral valve prolapse.

Prolapsed mitral valves are classified into several subtypes, based on leaflet thickness, type of connection to the mitral annulus, and concavity. Subtypes can be described as classic, nonclassic, symmetric, asymmetric, flail, or non-flail.

All measurements below refer to adult patients; applying them to children may be misleading.

=== Classic versus nonclassic ===
Prolapse occurs when the mitral valve leaflets are displaced more than 2 mm above the mitral annulus high points. The condition can be further divided into classic and nonclassic subtypes based on the thickness of the mitral valve leaflets: up to 5 mm is considered nonclassic, while anything beyond 5 mm is considered classic MVP.

=== Symmetric versus asymmetric ===
Classical prolapse may be subdivided into symmetric and asymmetric, referring to the point at which leaflet tips join the mitral annulus. In symmetric coaptation, leaflet tips meet at a common point on the annulus. Asymmetric coaptation is marked by one leaflet displaced toward the atrium with respect to the other. Patients with asymmetric prolapse are susceptible to severe deterioration of the mitral valve, with the possible rupture of the chordae tendineae and the development of a flail leaflet.

=== Flail versus non-flail ===
Diagram of an inverted heart; note the concavity of the leaflets demonstrating valve prolapse: LV = left ventricle; LA = left atrium; RV = right ventricle; RA = right atrium.

Asymmetric prolapse is further subdivided into flail and non-flail. Flail prolapse occurs when a leaflet tip turns outward, becoming concave toward the left atrium, causing the deterioration of the mitral valve. The severity of flail leaflet varies, ranging from tip eversion to chordal rupture. Dissociation of leaflet and chordae tendineae provides for unrestricted motion of the leaflet (hence "flail leaflet"). Thus patients with flail leaflets have a higher prevalence of mitral regurgitation than those with the non-flail subtype.

== Treatment ==
Individuals with mitral valve prolapse, particularly those without symptoms, often require no treatment. Those with mitral valve prolapse and symptoms of dysautonomia (palpitations, chest pain) may benefit from beta-blockers (e.g., propranolol, metoprolol, bisoprolol). People with prior stroke or atrial fibrillation may require blood thinners, such as aspirin or warfarin. In rare instances when mitral valve prolapse is associated with severe mitral regurgitation, surgical repair or replacement of the mitral valve may be necessary. Mitral valve repair is generally considered preferable to replacement. The so-called "respect rather than resect approach" with artificial chordae has proven to be safe and efficient. The most common suture materials for prefabricated loops are PTFE (Seramon) or ePTFE (GORE- TEX). Current ACC/AHA guidelines promote repair of mitral valve in people before symptoms of heart failure develop. Symptomatic people, those with evidence of diminished left ventricular function, or those with left ventricular dilatation need urgent attention.

=== Prevention of infective endocarditis ===
Individuals with MVP are at higher risk of bacterial infection of the heart, called infective endocarditis. This risk is approximately three-to eightfold the risk of infective endocarditis in the general population. Until 2007, the American Heart Association recommended prescribing antibiotics before invasive procedures, including those in dental surgery. Thereafter, they concluded that "prophylaxis for dental procedures should be recommended only for patients with underlying cardiac conditions associated with the highest risk of adverse outcome from infective endocarditis."

Many organisms responsible for endocarditis are slow-growing and may not be easily identified on routine blood cultures (these fastidious organisms require special culture media to grow). These include the HACEK organisms, which are part of the normal oropharyngeal flora and are responsible for perhaps 5 to 10% of infective endocarditis affecting native valves. It is important when considering endocarditis to keep these organisms in mind.

== Prognosis ==
Generally, MVP is benign. However, MVP patients with a murmur, not just an isolated click, have an increased mortality rate of 15-20%. The major predictors of mortality are the severity of mitral regurgitation and reduction in ejection fraction.

Close monitoring and treatment, if necessary, is recommended for those with severe MVP to prevent complications and reduce the risk of mortality. In most cases, individuals with MVP can lead a normal and healthy life with minimal symptoms.

== Prophylaxis ==
The consensus is that mitral valve prolapse is a non-preventable condition, although some of its complications may occur. Because symptoms rarely appear, the productivity of the patient's life is not affected. The worsening of the disorder can be delayed by avoiding smoking, the use of contraceptives (because they have the risk of clotting) and regulating the amount and type of exercise and nutrition under the supervision of a health professional. The risk of infective endocarditis is considered high in patients with prosthetic heart valves, moderate in those with mitral prolapse concomitant with mitral regurgitation and low in patients with mitral prolapse without other valve disease.

=== Antibiotic prophylaxis ===
Those with mitral prolapse are at increased risk of infective endocarditis, a bacterial infection of the heart tissue, as a result of certain routine non-sterile procedures, such as brushing the teeth. However, in April 2007, a study by the American Heart Association had determined that the risks of prescribing antibiotics outweigh the prophylactic antibiotics before invasive surgery, such as dental surgery or biopsy by colonoscopy or bronchoscopy.

== Epidemiology ==
Prior to the strict criteria for the diagnosis of mitral valve prolapse, as described above, the incidence of mitral valve prolapse in the general population varied greatly. Some studies estimated the incidence of mitral valve prolapse at 5 to 15 percent or even higher. One 1985 study suggested MVP in up to 35% of healthy teenagers.

Recent elucidation of mitral valve anatomy and the development of three-dimensional echocardiography have resulted in improved diagnostic criteria, and the true prevalence of MVP based on these criteria is estimated at 2-3%. As a part of the Framingham Heart Study, for example, the prevalence of mitral valve prolapse in Framingham, MA was estimated at 2.4%. There was a near-even split between classic and nonclassic MVP, with no significant age or sex discrimination. MVP is observed in 7% of autopsies in the United States.

In a Taiwanese CHIEF heart study of Asian adult military personnel, it was estimated that out of 2442 people in Hualien aged 18 to 39, mitral valve prolapse occurred in 3.36%. People with MVP had lower body mass index, somatic symptoms related to exercise (chest pain, dyspnea, palpitations during exercise) and systolic click in auscultation. 7 out of 82 participants with MVP had mild pectus excavatum.

== Research ==
In a human and mice study of MVP, a relationship was found between MVP and progressive fibrosis effects on left ventricular structure, which suggests the cause of molecular and cellular changes are a response of papillary and inferobasal myocardium to increased chordal tension from prolapsing mitral valve leaflets.

=== In animals ===
In 2019 an experimental adeno-associated virus (AAV)-based gene therapy method was developed by Rejuvenate Bio, a biotechnology company. The method was successfully and effectively used on mice to reverse multiple age-related diseases: heart failure, kidney failure, type 2 diabetes and obesity. The study found that mice experienced a 58% increase in heart function and 75% reduction in kidney degeneration. Rejuvenate Bio later collaborated with Tufts University to use the same method on Cavalier King Charles spaniel to stop the progression of mitral valve disease by stopping the accumulation of scar tissue in the heart. The therapy used a virus to deliver a genetic therapy that blocks the action of a specific protein that contributes to the accumulation of scar tissue.

== History ==
The term mitral valve prolapse was coined by J. Michael Criley in 1966 and gained acceptance over the other descriptor of "billowing" of the mitral valve, as described by John Brereton Barlow.
