= Papillary muscle =

Heart ventricle muscles

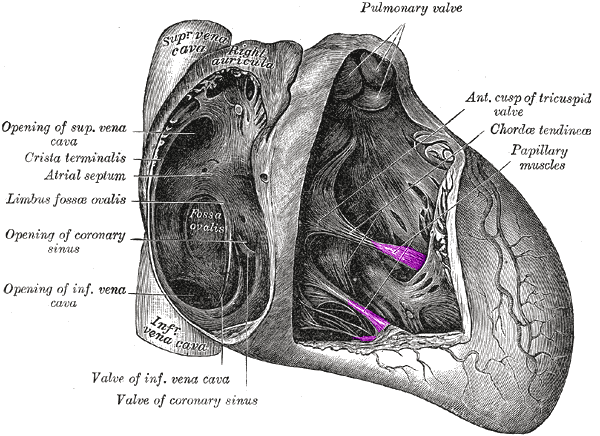
- Interior of right side of heart. Papillary muscles labeled in purple.

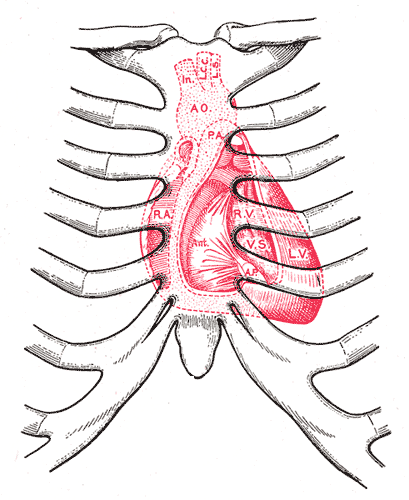
- Diagram showing relations of opened heart to front of thoracic wall. Ant. Anterior segment of tricuspid valve. A O. Aorta. A.P. Anterior papillary muscle. In. Brachiocephalic artery (Innominate). L.C.C. Left common carotid artery. L.S. Left subclavian artery. L.V. Left ventricle. P.A. Pulmonary artery. R.A. Right atrium. R.V. Right ventricle. V.S. Ventricular septum.

Details

Identifiers
- Latin: musculus papillaris
- MeSH: D010210
- TA98: A12.1.00.022
- FMA: 12154

The papillary muscles are muscles located in the ventricles of the heart. They attach to the cusps of the atrioventricular valves (the mitral valve between the left atrium and ventricle and the tricuspid valve between the right atrium and ventricle), via the chordae tendineae. They contract to prevent inversion or prolapse of these valves on systole (or ventricular contraction).

== Structure ==
There are five total papillary muscles in the heart: three in the right ventricle and two in the left ventricle. The anterior, posterior, and septal papillary muscles of the right ventricle each attach via chordae tendineae to the tricuspid valve. The anterolateral and posteromedial papillary muscles of the left ventricle attach via chordae tendineae to the mitral valve.

=== Blood supply to the left ventricle ===
The mitral valve papillary muscles in the left ventricle are called the anterolateral and posteromedial muscles.

- Anterolateral muscle blood supply: left anterior descending artery - diagonal branch (LAD) and left circumflex artery - obtuse marginal branch (LCX)
- Posteromedial muscle blood supply: right coronary artery - posterior interventricular artery (RCA)

The posteromedial muscle ruptures more frequently because it only has one source of blood supply, hence RCA occlusion can cause papillary muscle rupture.

== Function ==
The papillary muscles of both the right and left ventricles begin to contract shortly before ventricular systole and maintain tension throughout. This prevents regurgitation—backward flow of ventricular blood into the atrial cavities—by bracing the atrioventricular valves against prolapse—being forced back into the atria by the high pressure in the ventricles.

== Clinical significance ==
Papillary muscle rupture can be caused by a myocardial infarction, and dysfunction can be caused by ischemia. Rarely, blunt chest trauma can be the cause of papillary muscle rupture, resulting from the sudden deceleration or compression of the heart. Complications may lead to worsening of mitral regurgitation.

== Additional images ==
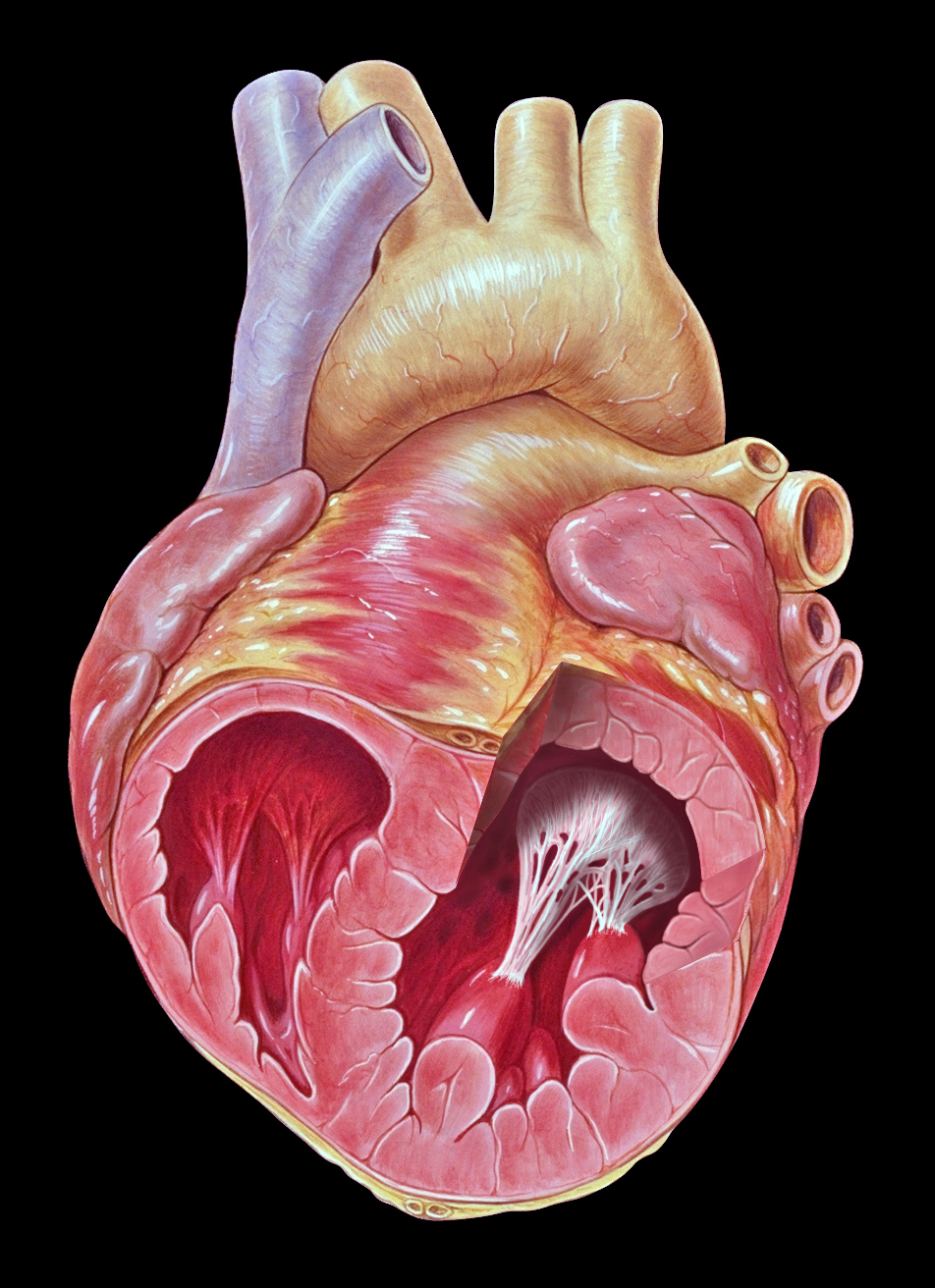
Opened chambers of the heart displaying papillary muscles and chordae tendineae

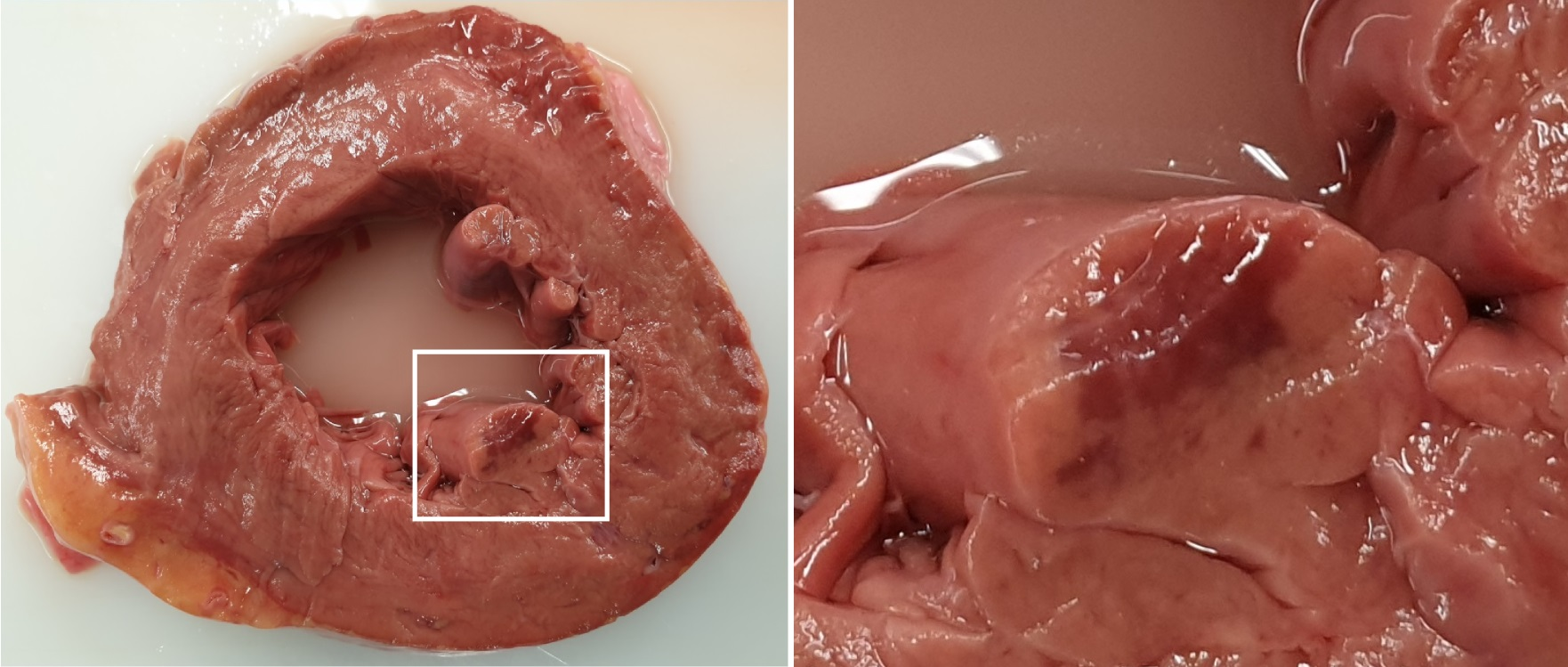
Papillary muscle infarction

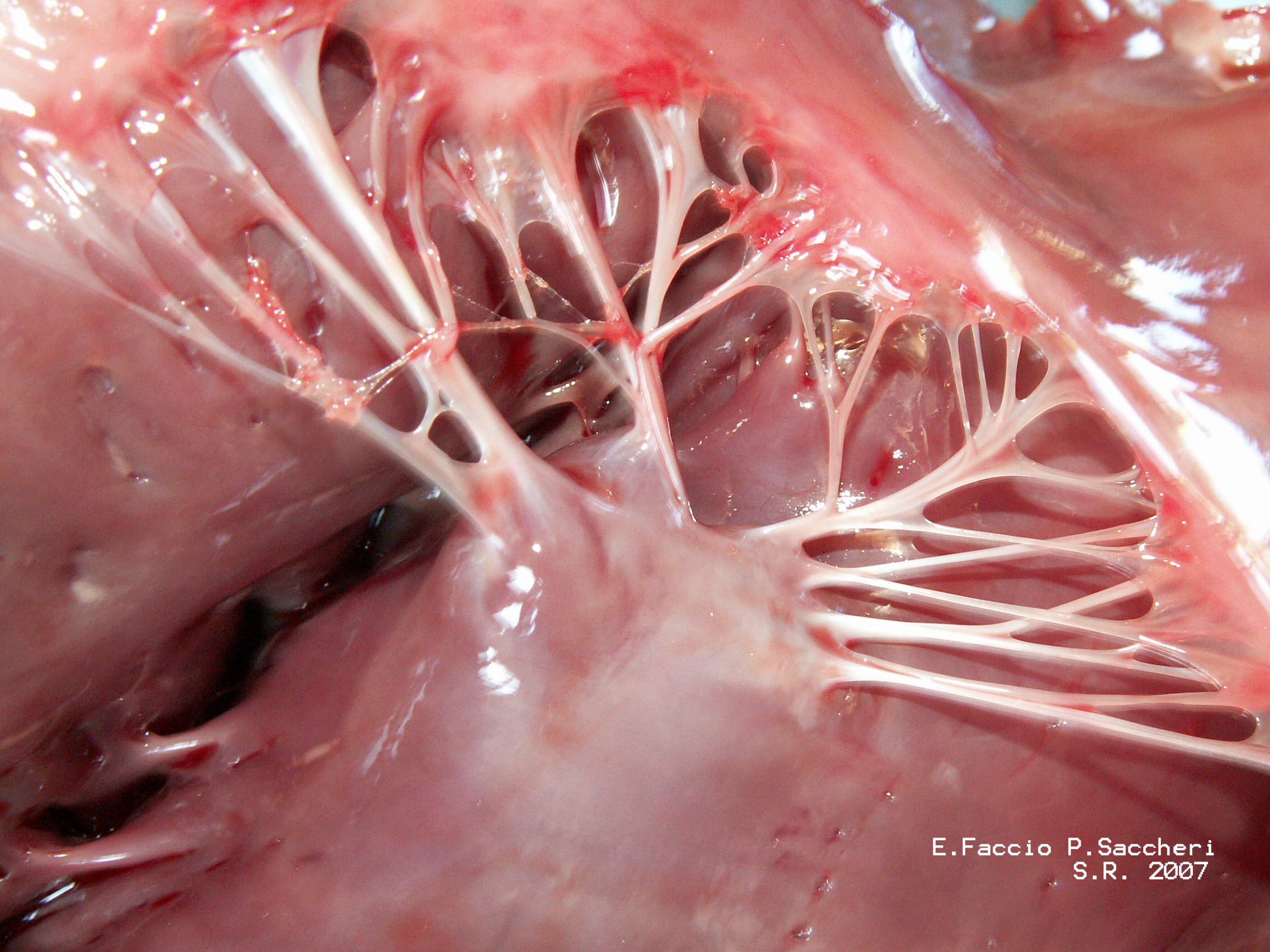
Papillary muscles and chordae tendineae

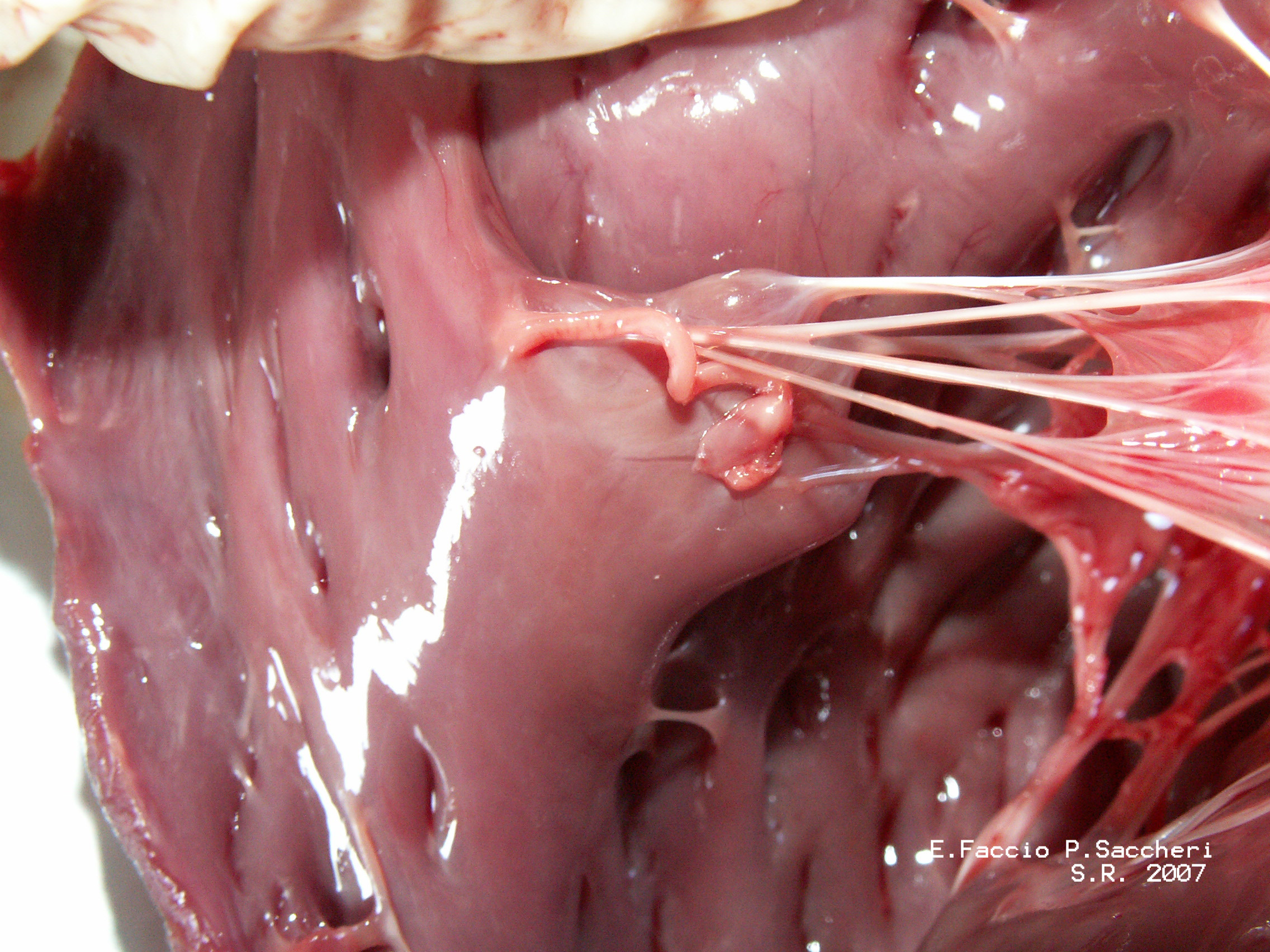
Papillary muscles and chordae tendineae

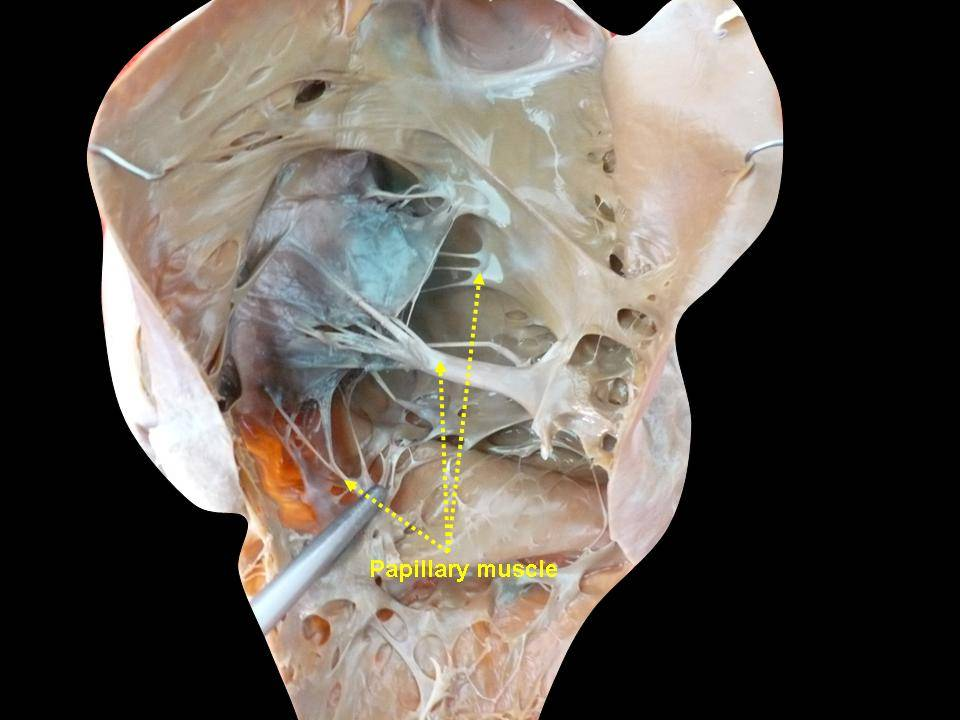
Papillary muscles. Deep dissection.

== See also ==
- Trabeculae carneae
