= Chordae tendineae =

Inelastic cords of fibrous connective tissue connecting papillary muscles to heart valves

- The chordae tendineae connect the valves to the heart muscle

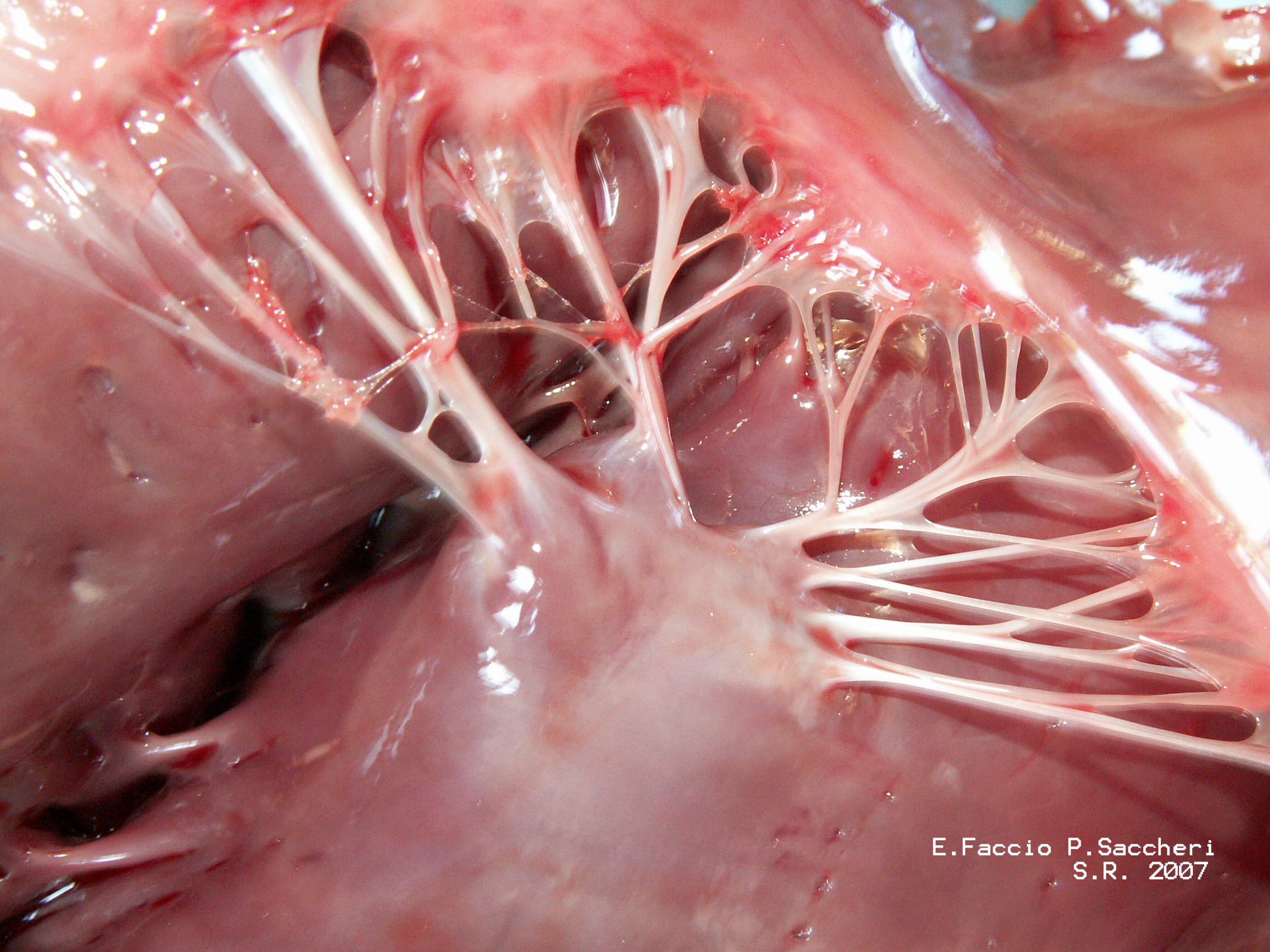
- Papillary muscles and chordae tendineae

Details

Identifiers
- Latin: chordae tendineae cordis
- MeSH: D002815
- TA98: A12.1.00.023
- FMA: 76527

The chordae tendineae (sing.: chorda tendinea) or tendinous cords, colloquially known as the heart strings, are inelastic cords of fibrous connective tissue that connect the papillary muscles to the tricuspid valve and the mitral valve in the heart.

== Structure ==
The chordae tendineae connect the atrioventricular valves (tricuspid and mitral), to the papillary muscles within the ventricles. Multiple chordae tendineae attach to each leaflet or cusp of the valves. Chordae tendineae contain elastin in a delicate structure notably at their periphery.

== Function ==
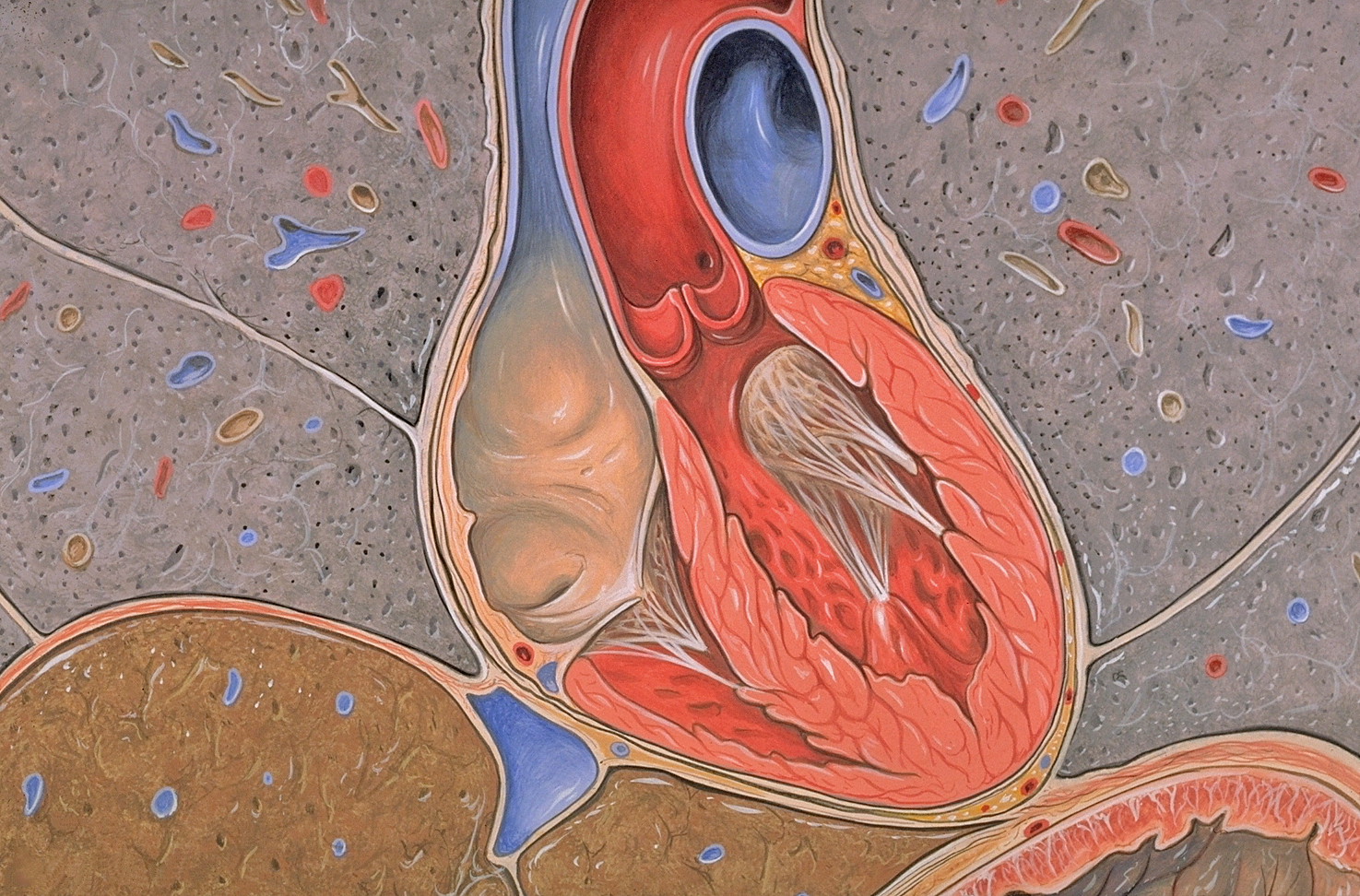
A medical illustration showing a cross section of the heart and lungs, chordae tendineae visible.

During atrial systole, blood flows from the atria to the ventricles down the pressure gradient. Chordae tendineae are relaxed because the atrioventricular (AV) valves are forced open.

When the ventricles of the heart contract in ventricular systole, the increased blood pressures in both chambers push the AV valves to close simultaneously, preventing the backflow of blood into the atria. Since the blood pressure in the atria is much lower than that in the ventricles, the flaps attempt to evert to the low pressure regions. The chordae tendineae prevent this prolapse by becoming tense, which pulls on the flaps, holding them in a closed position.

== Clinical significance ==
=== Ruptured chordae tendineae ===
Valvular heart disease can lead to ruptured chordae tendineae. This can cause severe mitral insufficiency.

=== Parachute mitral valve ===
Parachute mitral valve occurs when all the chordae tendineae of the mitral valve attach to a single papillary muscle. This causes mitral valve stenosis at an early age. It is a rare congenital heart defect. Although it often causes mitral insufficiency, it may not present any symptoms.

== Additional images ==
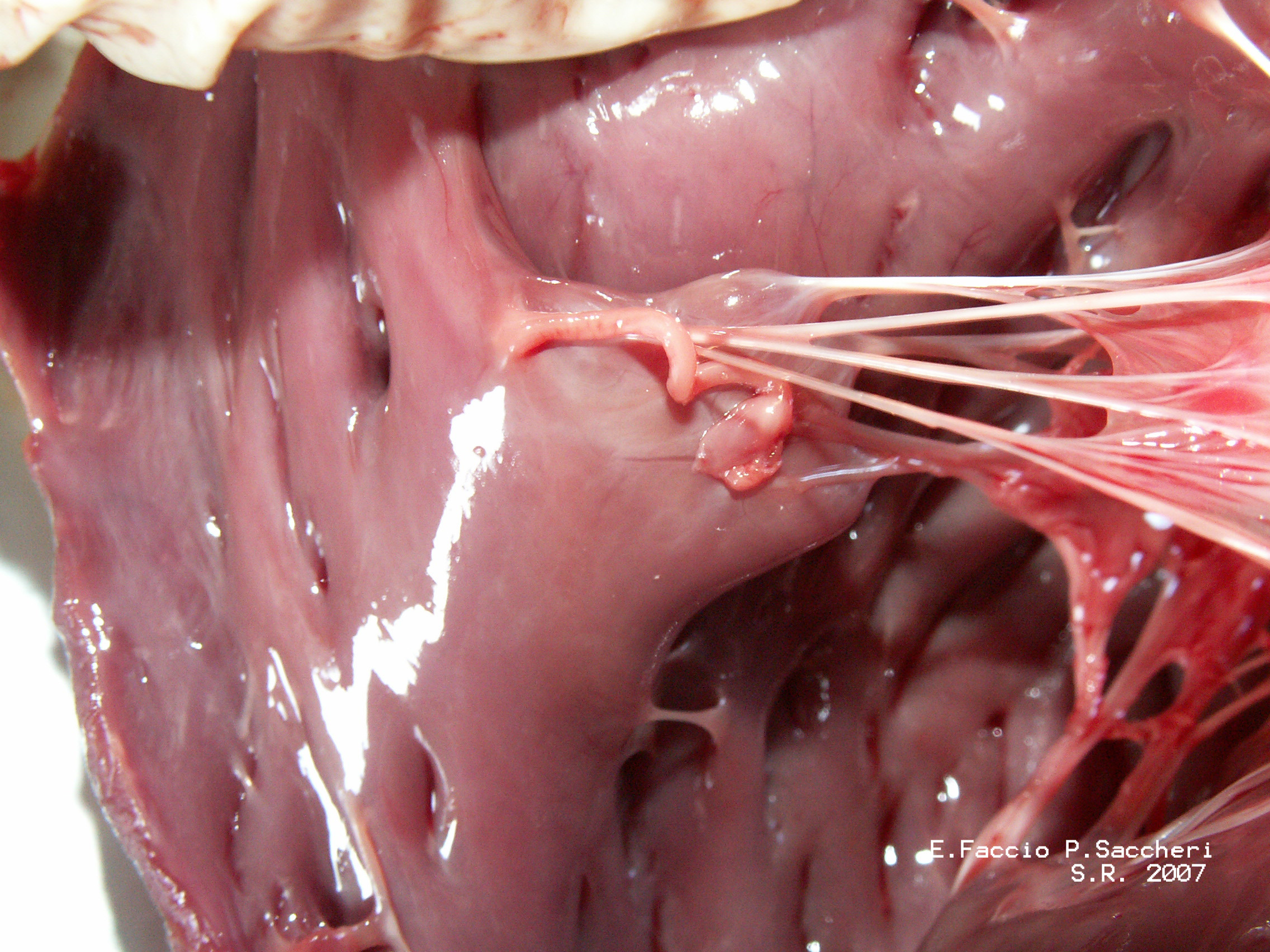
Papillary muscles and chordae tendineae

Ultrasound showing redundant chordae tendineae

== See also ==
- Cardiac cycle
