= Mitral valve =

Valve in the heart connecting the left atrium and left ventricle

- Anterior (frontal) view of the opened heart. White arrows indicate normal blood flow. (Mitral valve labeled at center right.)

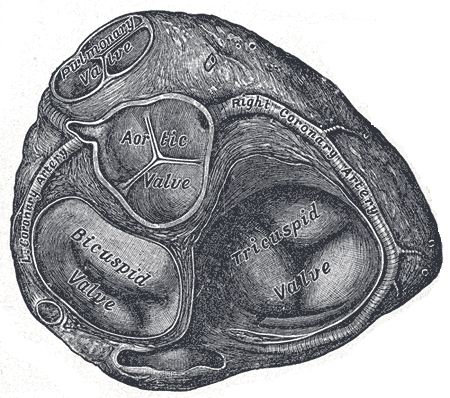
- Base of ventricles exposed by removal of the atria. (Bicuspid (mitral) valve visible at bottom left. Tricuspid valve visible at bottom right.)

Details

Identifiers
- Latin: valva atrioventricularis sinistra, valva mitralis, valvula bicuspidalis
- MeSH: D008943
- TA98: A12.1.04.003
- TA2: 3987
- FMA: 7235

The mitral valve (/ˈmaɪtrəl/ MY-trəl), also known as the bicuspid valve or left atrioventricular valve, is one of the four heart valves. It has two cusps or flaps and lies between the left atrium and the left ventricle of the heart. The heart valves are all one-way valves allowing blood flow in just one direction. The mitral valve and the tricuspid valve are known as the atrioventricular valves because they lie between the atria and the ventricles.

In normal conditions, blood flows through an open mitral valve during diastole with contraction of the left atrium, and the mitral valve closes during systole with contraction of the left ventricle. The valve opens and closes because of pressure differences, opening when there is greater pressure in the left atrium than ventricle and closing when there is greater pressure in the left ventricle than atrium.

In abnormal conditions, blood may flow backward through the valve (mitral regurgitation) or the mitral valve may be narrowed (mitral stenosis). Rheumatic heart disease often affects the mitral valve; the valve may also prolapse with age and be affected by infective endocarditis.

The name of the mitral valve is derived from the word mitre, referencing the ceremonial hat worn by Roman Catholic bishops, due to the resemblance between the two leaflets of the valve and the distinctive shape of the hat.

== Structure ==
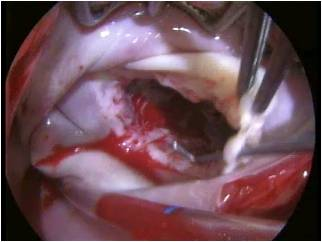
Operative view of the mitral valve with a chordal rupture "fail" of the anterior leaflet

The mitral valve is typically 4 to 6 square centimetres (0.62 to 0.93 sq in) in area and sits in the left heart between the left atrium and the left ventricle. It has two cusps: an anterior one, and a posterior one. The opening of the mitral valve is surrounded by a fibrous ring known as the mitral annulus. The anterior cusp attaches to one third of the circumference of the annulus, and the posterior cusp attaches to the remaining two thirds of its circumference. The anterior cusp is thicker and more rigid than the posterior one, and covers approximately two-thirds of the valve. The anterior cusp intervenes between the mitral and aortic orifices. Although the anterior leaflet takes up a larger part of the ring and rises higher, the posterior leaflet has a larger surface area.

=== Leaflets ===
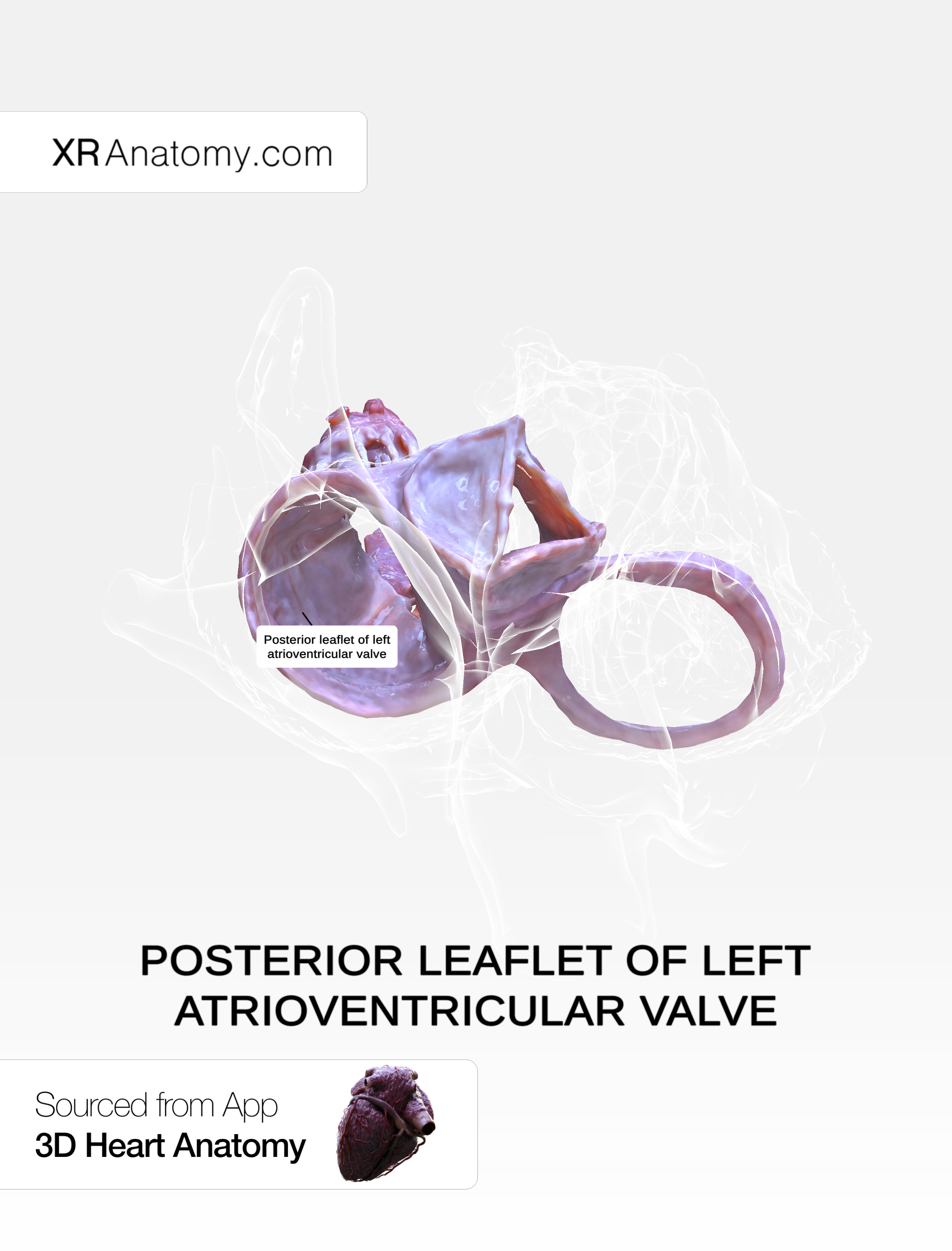

In Carpentier's classification of a mitral valve, both the posterior and anterior mitral valve leaflets are divided into eight segments: P3 (medial scallop), P2 (central scallop), P1 (lateral scallop), A3 (anteromedial segment), A2 (anterocentral), A1 (anterolateral), PMC (posteromedial commissure), ALC (anterolateral commissure). Mitral leaflet thickness is usually about 1 mm but sometimes can range from 3 to 5 mm.

=== Chordae tendineae ===
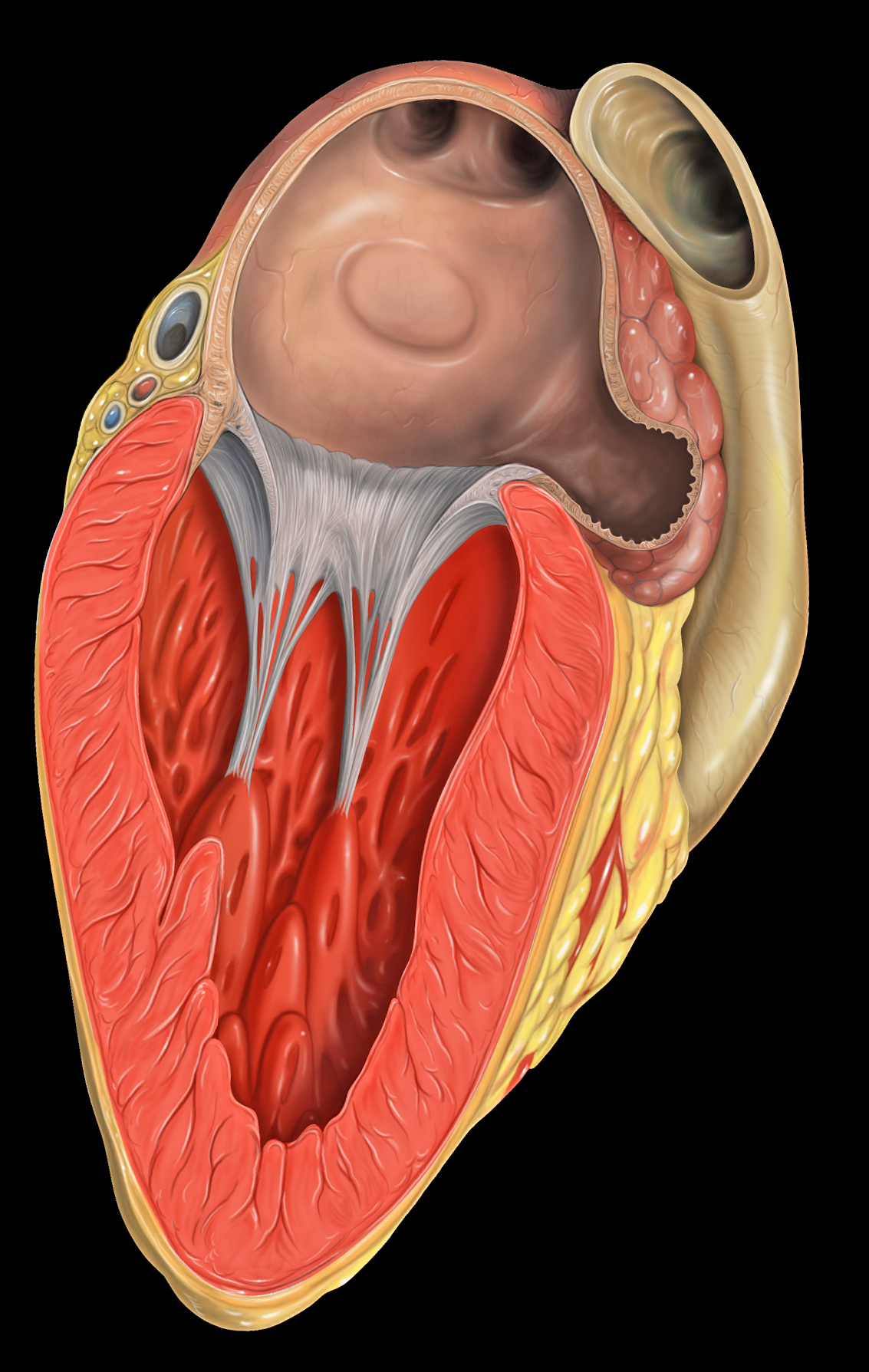
The left side of the heart. The mitral valve, as well as the chordae tendinae are visible as white strings. These connect to the papillary muscles visible attaching to the muscular ventricle.

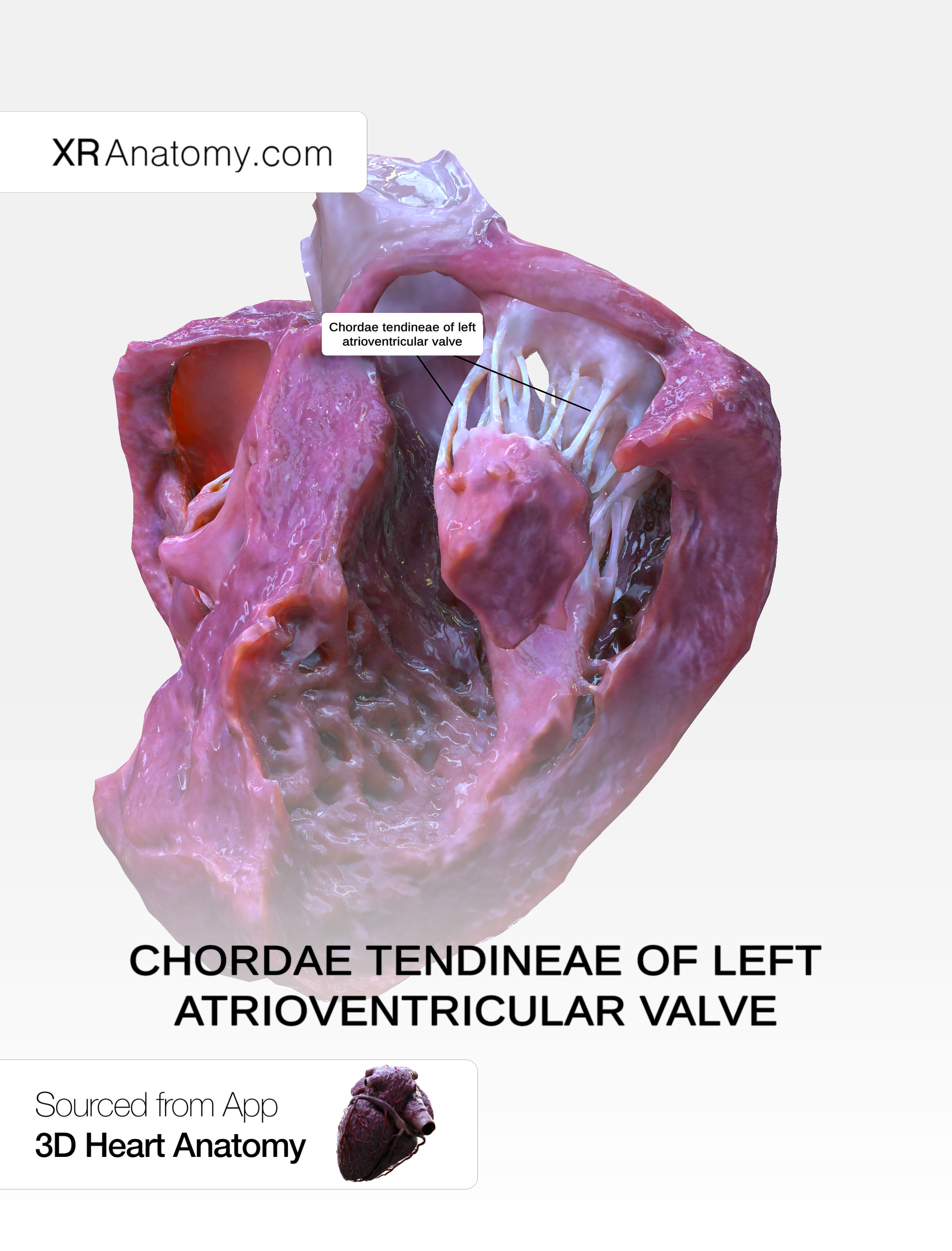
Chordae tendineae of left atrioventricular valve

The valve leaflets are prevented from prolapsing into the left atrium by the action of chordae tendineae. The chordae tendineae are inelastic tendons attached at one end to papillary muscles in the left ventricle, and at the other to the valve cusps. Papillary muscles are finger-like projections from the wall of the left ventricle.

When the left ventricle contracts, the pressure in the ventricle forces the valve to close, while the tendons keep the leaflets coapting together and prevent the valve from opening in the wrong direction (thus preventing blood flowing back to the left atrium). Each chord has a different thickness. The thinnest ones are attached to the free leaflet margin, whereas the thickest ones (strut chords) are attached further from the free margin. This disposition has important effects on systolic stress distribution physiology.

=== Annulus ===
The mitral annulus is a fibrous ring that is attached to the mitral valve leaflets. Unlike prosthetic valves, it is not continuous. The mitral annulus is saddle shaped and changes in shape throughout the cardiac cycle. The annulus contracts and reduces its surface area during systole to help provide complete closure of the leaflets. Expansion of the annulus can result in leaflets that do not join soundly together, leading to functional mitral regurgitation.

The normal diameter of the mitral annulus is 2.7 to 3.5 centimetres (1.1 to 1.4 in), and the circumference is 8 to 9 centimetres (3.1 to 3.5 in). Microscopically, there is no evidence of an annular structure anteriorly, where the mitral valve leaflet is contiguous with the posterior aortic root.

== Function ==
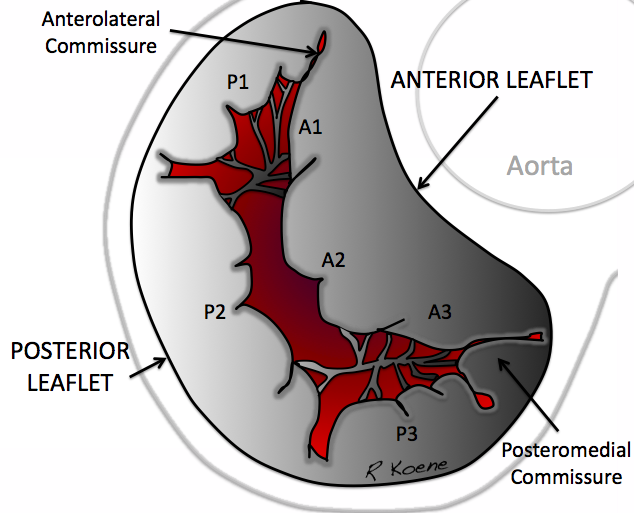
Mitral annulus

During left ventricular diastole, after the pressure drops in the left ventricle due to relaxation of the ventricular myocardium, the mitral valve opens, and blood travels from the left atrium to the left ventricle. About 70 to 80% of the blood that travels across the mitral valve occurs during the early filling phase of the left ventricle. This early filling phase is due to active relaxation of the ventricular myocardium, causing a pressure gradient that allows a rapid flow of blood from the left atrium, across the mitral valve. This early filling across the mitral valve is seen on doppler echocardiography of the mitral valve as the E wave.

After the E wave, there is a period of slow filling of the ventricle.

Left atrial contraction (left atrial systole) (during left ventricular diastole) causes added blood to flow across the mitral valve immediately before left ventricular systole. This late flow across the open mitral valve is seen on doppler echocardiography of the mitral valve as the A wave. The late filling of the left ventricle contributes about 20% to the volume in the left ventricle prior to ventricular systole and is known as the atrial kick.

The mitral annulus changes in shape and size during the cardiac cycle. It is smaller at the end of atrial systole due to the contraction of the left atrium around it, like a sphincter. This reduction in annulus size at the end of atrial systole may be important for the proper coapting of the leaflets of the mitral valve when the left ventricle contracts and pumps blood. Leaking valves can be corrected by mitral valve annuloplasty, a common surgical procedure that aims at restoring proper leaflet adjustment.

== Clinical significance ==
=== Disease ===
Mitral Valve Prolapse murmur
Heart sounds of a 16 year old girl diagnosed with mitral valve prolapse and mitral regurgitation. Auscultating her heart, a systolic murmur and click is heard. Recorded with the stethoscope over the mitral valve.

There are some valvular heart diseases that affect the mitral valve. Mitral stenosis is a narrowing of the valve. This can be heard as an opening snap; a heart sound which is not normally present.

Classic mitral valve prolapse is caused by an excess of connective tissue that thickens the spongiosa layer of the cusp and separates collagen bundles in the fibrosa. This weakens the cusps and adjacent tissue, resulting in an increased cuspal area and lengthening of the chordae tendineae. Elongation of the chordae tendineae often causes rupture, commonly to the chordae attached to the posterior cusp. Advanced lesions—also commonly involving the posterior leaflet—lead to leaflet folding, inversion, and displacement toward the left atrium.

A valve prolapse can result in mitral insufficiency, which is the regurgitation or backflow of blood from the left ventricle to the left atrium due to the incomplete closure of the valve causing a systolic murmur heard at the apex of the heart. This increase in pressure in the left atrium and pulmonary circuit can lead to symptoms like fatigue, shortness of breath, and atrial fibrillation over time.

Rheumatic heart disease often affects the mitral valve. The valve may also be affected by infective endocarditis.

There are also some rarer forms of congenital mitral valve disease that are often associated with other congenital heart anomalies. Parachute mitral valve occurs when all chordae tendineae of the mitral valve are abnormally attached to a single (or fused) papillary muscle. Straddling Mitral Valve occurs when the mitral valve's chordal attachments straddles, or goes through, a ventricular septal defect (VSD) and so has chordae originating on both sides of the ventricular septum. Mitral valve agenesis is very rare, defined as an absence or minimal presence of both mitral valve leaflets (complete agenesis) or one of the leaflets (partial agenesis).

Surgery can be performed to replace or repair a damaged valve. A less invasive method is that of mitral valvuloplasty which uses a balloon catheter to open up a stenotic valve. Alternatively, the Lawrie technique is an option for patients who have less valve tissue available for repair as they may have damaged or fragile valve leaflets. During the Lawrie technique, artificial fabric chordae are used to repair the valve which spares the existing valve leaflets and chordae during the repair.

Rarely there can be a severe form of calcification of the mitral valve annulus that can be mistaken for an intracardiac mass or thrombus.

Mitral disease can be classified using Carpentier's classification which is based on the leaflet motion. Type I pertains to normal leaflet motion. Whereas, disease of the valve is categorized to primary mitral regurgitation or secondary mitral regurgitation based on the regurgitant etiology. Type II pertains to excessive leaflet motion leading to leaflet prolapse. Common causes include, but is not limited to, Barlow disease, myxomatous degeneration, inflammation, and papillary muscle rupture. Type III pertains to restrictive motion of the leaflets. Type IIIa pertains to restrictive motion during systole and diastole. Type IIIb pertains to restrictive motion during systole.

=== Investigation ===
The closing of the mitral valve and the tricuspid valve constitutes the first heart sound (S1), which can be heard with a stethoscope. It is not the valve closure itself which produces the sound but the sudden cessation of blood flow, when the mitral and tricuspid valves close. Abnormalities associated with the mitral valve can often be heard when listening with a stethoscope.

The mitral valve is often also investigated using an ultrasound scan, which can reveal the size, anatomy and flow of blood through the valve.

== Etymology ==
The word mitral comes from Latin, meaning "shaped like a mitre" (bishop's hat). The word bicuspid uses combining forms of bi-, from Latin, meaning "double", and cusp, meaning "point", reflecting the dual-flap shape of the valve.

== Additional images ==
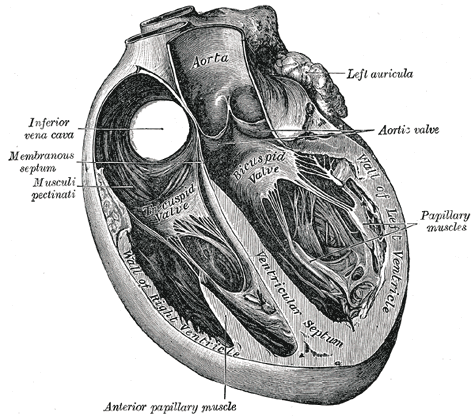
The human heart, viewed from the front. The mitral valve is visible on the right as the "bicuspid valve"

The chest, showing surface relations of bones, lungs (purple), pleura (blue), and heart (red). Heart valves are labeled with "B", "T", "A", and "P".

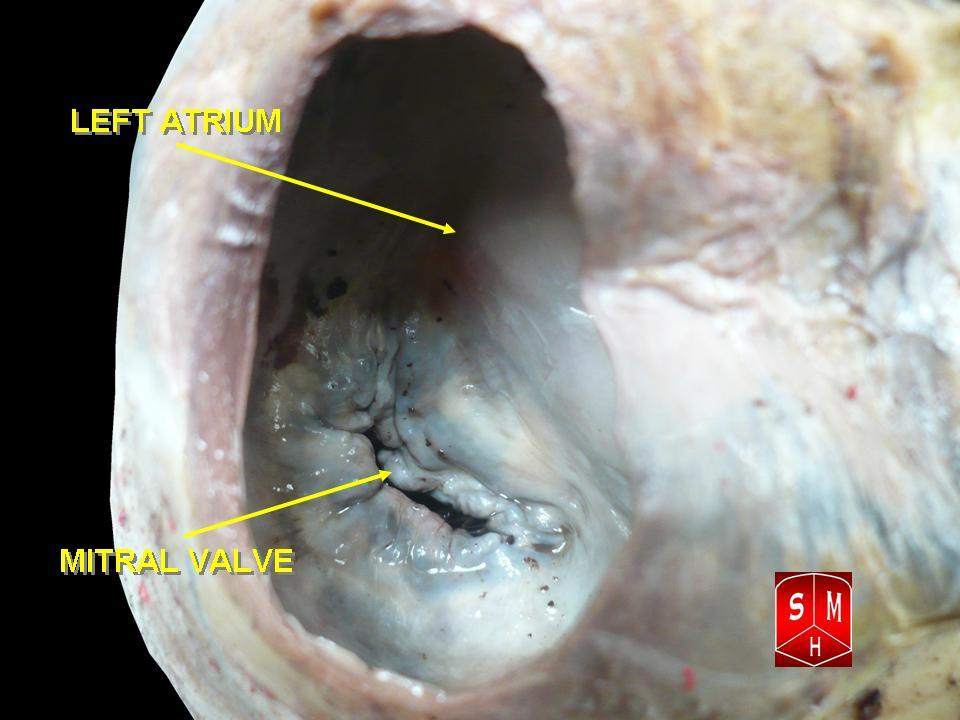
Mitral valve, viewed in a cadaver specimen from within the left atrium.

== See also ==
- Electrocardiography
- Heart
- Heart rhythm
