= Minimaze procedure =

Types of cardiac surgery procedures

- ICD-9-CM: 37.33

The mini-maze procedures are cardiac surgery procedures intended to cure atrial fibrillation (AF), a common disturbance of heart rhythm. They are procedures derived from the original maze procedure developed by James Cox, MD.

== The origin of the mini-maze procedures: The Cox maze procedure ==
James Cox, MD, and associates developed the "maze" or "Cox maze" procedure, an "open-heart" cardiac surgery procedure intended to eliminate atrial fibrillation, and performed the first one in 1987. "Maze" refers to the series of incisions arranged in a maze-like pattern in the atria. The intention was to eliminate AF by using incisional scars to block abnormal electrical circuits (atrial macroreentry) that AF requires. This required an extensive series of endocardial (from the inside of the heart) incisions through both atria, a median sternotomy (vertical incision through the breastbone) and cardiopulmonary bypass (heart-lung machine; extracorporeal circulation). A series of improvements were made, culminating in 1992 in the Cox maze III procedure, originally a cut-and-sew procedure, but later performed with cryosurgical lesions. In 2002 Maze IV was first used combining bipolar radiofrequency clamps with linear cryoprobes. Cox-Maze IV is now considered to be the "gold standard" for effective surgical cure of AF, but the results are institution dependent. It was quite successful in eliminating AF, but had drawbacks as well. The Cox maze III is sometimes referred to as the "Traditional maze", the "cut and sew maze", or simply the "maze".

== Minimally invasive epicardial surgical procedures for AF (minimaze) ==
Efforts have since been made to equal the success of the Cox maze III while reducing surgical complexity and likelihood of complications. During the late 1990s, operations similar to the Cox maze, but with fewer atrial incisions, led to the use of the terms "minimaze", "mini maze" and "mini-maze", although these were still major operations.

A primary goal has been to perform a curative, "maze-like" procedure epicardially (from the outside of the heart), so that it could be performed on a normally beating heart, without cardiopulmonary bypass. Until recently this was not thought possible; as recently as 2004, Dr. Cox defined the mini-maze as requiring an endocardial approach:

"In summary, it would appear that placing the following lesions can cure most patients with atrial fibrillation of either type: pulmonary vein encircling incision, left atrial isthmus lesion with its attendant coronary sinus lesion, and the right atrial isthmus lesion. We call this pattern of atrial lesions the "mini-maze Procedure" ... None of the present energy sources—including cryotherapy, unipolar radiofrequency, irrigated radiofrequency, bipolar radiofrequency, microwave, and laser energy—are capable of creating the left atrial isthmus lesion from the epicardial surface, because of the necessity of penetrating through the circumflex coronary artery to reach the left atrial wall near the posterior mitral annulus. Therefore, the mini-maze procedure cannot be performed epicardially by means of any presently available energy source."

Although Dr. Cox's 2004 definition specifically excludes an epicardial approach to eliminate AF, he and others pursued this important goal, and the meaning of the term changed as successful epicardial procedures were developed. In 2002 Saltman performed a completely endoscopic surgical ablation of AF and subsequently published their results in 14 patients. These were performed epicardially, on the beating heart, without cardiopulmonary bypass or median sternotomy. Their method came to be known as the minimaze or microwave minimaze procedure, because microwave energy was used to make the lesions that had previously been performed by the surgeon's scalpel.

Shortly thereafter, Randall K. Wolf, MD and others developed a procedure using radiofrequency energy rather than microwave, and different, slightly larger incisions. In 2005, he published his results in the first 27 patients. This came to be known as the Wolf minimaze procedure.

Today, the terms "minimaze", "mini-maze", and "mini maze" are still sometimes used to describe open heart procedures requiring cardiopulmonary bypass and median sternotomy, but more commonly they refer to minimally invasive, epicardial procedures not requiring cardiopulmonary bypass, such as those developed by Saltman, Wolf, and others. These procedures are characterized by:

1. No median sternotomy incision; instead, an endoscope and/or "mini-thoracotomy" incisions between the ribs are used.
2. No cardiopulmonary bypass; instead, these procedures are performed on the normally beating heart.
3. Few or no actual incisions into the heart itself. The "maze" lesions are made epicardially by using radiofrequency, microwave, or ultrasonic energy, or by cryosurgery.
4. The part of the left atrium in which most clots form (the "appendage") is usually removed, in an effort to reduce the long-term likelihood of stroke.

=== Microwave minimaze ===
Completely Endoscopic Microwave Ablation of Atrial Fibrillation on the Beating Heart Using Bilateral Thoracoscopy: The microwave minimaze requires three 5 mm to 1 cm incisions on each side of the chest for the surgical tools and the endoscope. The pericardium is entered, and two sterile rubber tubes are threaded behind the heart, in the transverse and oblique sinuses. These tubes are joined, then used to guide the flexible microwave antenna energy source through the sinuses behind the heart, to position it for ablation. Energy is delivered and the atrial tissue heated and destroyed in a series of steps as the microwave antenna is withdrawn behind the heart. The lesions form a "box-like" pattern around all four pulmonary veins behind the heart. The left atrial appendage is usually removed.

=== Wolf minimaze ===
Video-assisted Bilateral Epicardial Bipolar Radiofrequency Pulmonary Vein Isolation and Left Atrial Appendage Excision: The Wolf minimaze requires one 5 cm and two 1 cm incisions on each side of the chest. These incisions allow the surgeon to maneuver the tools, view areas through an endoscope, and to see the heart directly. The right side of the left atrium is exposed first. A clamp-like tool is positioned on the left atrium near the right pulmonary veins, and the atrial tissue is heated between the jaws of the clamp, cauterizing the area. The clamp is removed. The autonomic nerves (ganglionated plexi) that may cause AF may be eliminated as well. Subsequently, the left side of the chest is entered. The ligament of Marshall (a vestigial structure with marked autonomic activity) is removed. The clamp is subsequently positioned on the left atrium near the left pulmonary veins for ablation. Direct testing to demonstrate complete electrical isolation of the pulmonary veins, and that the ganglionated plexi are no longer active, may be performed.

=== High Intensity Focused Ultrasound (HIFU) minimaze ===
Surgical ablation of atrial fibrillation with off-pump, epicardial, high-intensity focused ultrasound: Although the HIFU minimaze is performed epicardially, on the normally beating heart, it is also usually performed in conjunction with other cardiac surgery, and so would not be minimally invasive in those cases. An ultrasonic device is positioned epicardially, on the left atrium, around the pulmonary veins, and intense acoustic energy is directed at the atrium to destroy tissue in the appropriate regions near the pulmonary veins.

== Mechanism of elimination of atrial fibrillation ==
The mechanism by which AF is eliminated by curative procedures such as the maze, minimaze, or catheter ablation is controversial. All successful methods destroy tissue in the areas of the left atrium near the junction of the pulmonary veins, hence these regions are thought to be important. A concept gaining support is that paroxysmal AF is mediated in part by the autonomic nervous system and that the intrinsic cardiac nervous system, which is located in these regions, plays an important role. Supporting this is the finding that targeting these autonomic sites improves the likelihood of successful elimination of AF by catheter ablation.

== Patient selection ==
The minimaze procedures are alternatives to catheter ablation of AF, and the patient selection criteria are similar. Patients are considered for minimaze procedures if they have moderate or severe symptoms and have failed medical therapy; asymptomatic patients are generally not considered. Those most likely to have a good outcome have paroxysmal (intermittent) AF, and have a heart that is relatively normal. Those with severely enlarged atria, marked cardiomyopathy, or severely leaking heart valves are less likely to have a successful result; these procedures are generally not recommended for such patients. Previous cardiac surgery provides technical challenges due to scarring on the outside of the heart, but does not always preclude minimaze surgery.

== Surgical results ==
A 2013 review found the results of the minimally-invasive mini-maze procedure to be intermediate between the standard maze procedure and catheter ablation.

Long-term success of the minimaze procedures awaits a consensus. Attaining a consensus is hindered by several problems; perhaps the most important of these is incomplete or inconsistent post-procedure follow-up to determine if atrial fibrillation has recurred, although many reasons have been considered. It has been clearly demonstrated that longer or more intensive follow-up identifies much more recurrent atrial fibrillation, hence a procedure with more careful follow-up will appear to be less successful. In addition, procedures continue to evolve rapidly, so long follow-up data do not accurately reflect current procedural methods. For more recent minimaze procedures, only relatively small and preliminary reports are available. With those caveats in mind, it can be said that reported short-term freedom from atrial fibrillation following the radiofrequency ("Wolf") procedure ranges from 67% to 91% with longer-term results in a similar range, but limited primarily to patients with paroxysmal atrial fibrillation.
