= Richard Lee (surgeon) =

American cardiac surgeon (21st century)

- Occupation: Cardiac Surgeon
- Employer: Saint Louis University Hospital
- Known for: Hybrid Maze
- Board member of: Vice chair of surgery at Saint Louis University, Former Co-director of the Center for Comprehensive Cardiovascular Care

Richard Lee is a cardiac surgeon in St. Louis, Missouri, who helped pioneer a staged Hybrid Maze, a procedure for atrial fibrillation or AFIB. combining surgery and catheter based approaches.

He was the vice chair of surgery at Saint Louis University and co-director of the Center for Comprehensive Cardiovascular Care at Saint Louis University Hospital.

== Education ==
Lee received a B.A. from Northwestern University in 1988. He graduated from the University of Illinois College of Medicine in 1993 with his M.D. degree. Lee completed his internship at the Medical College of Wisconsin and his residencies at Rush University Medical Center and Washington University School of Medicine. He finished a fellowship at Cleveland Clinic in Adult Cardiac Surgery and Heart Transplantation in 2003. During his surgical training, he spent two years in the research lab of James L. Cox, MD. There he developed a technique to re-create the Cox maze procedure on a beating heart.

Lee has an MBA from the John M. Olin School of Business, also known as the Olin Business School, at Washington University in St. Louis.

== Career ==
From 2003 to 2007, Lee was Assistant Professor of Surgery in the Cardiothoracic Surgery Division at Saint Louis University School of Medicine. During that time he served as surgical director for heart transplantation as well as Director of the Coronary artery bypass surgery Outcomes Program.

In 2007, Lee moved to Northwestern University and the Feinberg School of Medicine in Chicago, Illinois as Assistant Professor of Surgery. During this time, he was Surgical Director of the Center for Heart Rhythm Disorders at the Bluhm Cardiovascular Institute of Northwestern Memorial Hospital. It was there his research into surgical options for atrial fibrillation were honed, finding "Patients undergoing surgical treatment of atrial fibrillation had survival similar to that of patients without a history of atrial fibrillation."

He returned to St. Louis in 2012, to become vice chair of surgery at Saint Louis University and co-director of the Center for Comprehensive Cardiovascular Care at Saint Louis University Hospital, where they invested $5 million to create the Center and recruit Lee back from Chicago to help run it.

Lee increased the volume of surgeries at Saint Louis University Hospital, working with co-director Michael Lim, MD, to combine division of cardiology with division of cardiac surgery in a single program.

In 2018 he became the new chief of the Division of Cardiothoracic Surgery in the Department of Surgery at the Medical College of Georgia at Augusta University.

He serves as an associate editor of the Annals of Thoracic Surgery.
