= Richard T. Lee =

Richard T. Lee may refer to:

- Richard Lee (Canadian politician) (born 1954), member of the British Columbia Legislative Assembly
- Richard T. Lee (golfer) (born 1990), Canadian golfer

== See also ==
- Richard Lee (disambiguation)
