= Richard B. Lee =

Richard B. Lee may refer to:

- Richard B. Lee, pardoned rebel lieutenant colonel from North Carolina
- Richard Bland Lee (1761 – 1827), an American planter, jurist, and politician from Fairfax County, Virginia.
- Richard Borshay Lee (born 1937), a Canadian anthropologist

== See also ==
- Richard Lee (disambiguation)
