= James L. Cox =

American cardiologist

- Born: December 24, 1942 (age 83); Fair Oaks, Arkansas
- Citizenship: American
- Education: University of Mississippi; University of Tennessee; Duke University
- Known for: development of Cox-maze procedure
- Scientific career
- Fields: Surgeon
- Workplaces: Duke University; Washington University in St. Louis; Georgetown University
- Doctoral advisor: David Sabiston

James L. Cox (born 24 December 1942, Fair Oaks, AR) is an American cardiothoracic surgeon and medical innovator best known for the development of the Cox maze procedure for treatment of atrial fibrillation in 1987.

== Early background ==
James Cox started his college education on a baseball scholarship at the University of Mississippi. On the day he received an offer to play professional baseball with the Los Angeles Dodgers he also received his acceptance to medical school at the University of Tennessee. He wanted to be a surgeon, so he chose medical school. He received his MD from Tennessee and began his surgical residency at Duke University in 1967. He served with the US Army medical corps from 1970 through 1972, then returned to Duke to finish his residency and surgical training, under the direction of David Sabiston. He join the faculty as an assistant professor of surgery in 1978.

== Medical career and innovation ==
Cox advanced to associate professor of surgery at Duke in 1982, then in 1983 he moved to the Washington University School of Medicine in St. Louis, where he became Professor and Chief, CardioThoracic Surgery. Specializing in surgeries for cardiac arrhythmias, in 1987 he first performed his eponymous "maze" procedure, which was recognized as the first cure for atrial fibrillation. From 1990 to 1997 he was Evarts A. Graham Professor of Surgery at Washington University.

In 1997 Cox moved to Georgetown University to become chairman of the department of cardiothoracic surgery. Shortly afterward he was forced by knee problems to give up surgery and he retired in 2000. He continued his active role in cardiology, serving as director on professional boards and as editor of two journals of the American Association for Thoracic Surgery.

In 2005 Cox became Emeritus Evarts A. Graham Professor of Surgery at Washington University. He currently serves as chairman and CEO of the World Heart Foundation and was the Medical Director for the ATS Medical division of Medtronic until 2010.

== Honors and awards ==
1960 - Three-Sport Athletic Scholarship, University of Mississippi 1967-- Alpha Omega Alpha Award as the Outstanding Student in Graduating Class, University of Tennessee School of Medicine 1971 – Special Commendation from Major General George S. Patton, III for Actions Performed on May 19, 1971

           - Early promotion to Field-Grade Officer (Major) 
           - Honorary induction into US Army Tanker Organization 

1978 – Duke University Medical Center - Surgical Scholar, National Institutes of Health 1983 - Professor and Chief, Division of Cardiothoracic Surgery, Washington University in St. Louis 1990 - First Evarts A. Graham Professor of Surgery 1991 - Vice-Chairman, Department of Surgery, Washington University in St. Louis 1992—The International Research in Cardiology Award (“RESCAR Award”, University of Limburg, Maastricht, The Netherlands 1995—Resident Research Award, Thoracic Surgery Directors Association 1996—Distinguished Scientist Award (NASPE), Heart Rhythm Society 1998—Distinguished Alumnus Award, University of Tennessee School of Medicine 1999 – The Pioneers in Teaching Award, University of Tennessee School of Medicine 2000 - One of 30 "Pioneers in Cardiothoracic Surgery for the First 50 Years of the Specialty", University of Paris 2001 – 81st President of the American Association for Thoracic Surgery (Youngest surgeon ever elected as AATS President) 2003 – The George Schimert Gold Medal Award, Buffalo General Hospital 2004 - Ray C. Fish Award for Scientific Achievement in Cardiovascular Diseases, Texas Heart Institute 2005 - Honorary Member, Russian Academy of Medical Science (Only the second American Heart Surgeon ever elected) 2005 - John Gibbon Lecture, American College of Surgeons 2006 - First Emeritus Evarts A. Graham Professor of Surgery 2009 - Distinguished Scientist Award, Society of Thoracic Surgeons 2011 - Edward Flanders Robb Ricketts Scientific Achievement Award 2013 – First Physician Ambassador of the Year Award, Global Atrial Fibrillation Alliance 2014 – The Burakovsky Award, Bakoulev National Cardiovascular Institute, Moscow, Russia 2014 – The Bakoulev Award for Scientific Achievement, Bakoulev National Cardiovascular Institute, Moscow, Russia 2015 - Distinguished Scientist Award, American Association for Thoracic Surgery 2015 - Establishment of “The James L. Cox Fellowship in Surgery for Atrial Fibrillation”, American Association for Thoracic Surgery Foundation 2016 – Scientific Excellence Award from the Mexican Society of Cardiac Surgery 2016 - Honorary Professor of Surgery, Mexican Society of Cardiac Surgery 2016 – The A.V. Vishnevsky Medal, Vishnevsky University Surgical Institute, Moscow, Russia 2016 – Honorary Professor of Surgery, Vishnevsky University, Moscow, Russia 2016 – Hall of Fame, University of Mississippi 2017 – Award as “The Father of Arrhythmia Surgery”, AATS STARS Conference 2019 – Honorary Fellow of the Indian Association of Cardiothoracic Surgery (IACTS) 2020 – Jacobson Innovation Award, American College of Surgeons
