= Richard Leigh =

Richard Leigh may refer to:

- Richard Leigh (martyr) (c. 1561–1588), Catholic martyr
- Richard Leigh (officer of arms), Clarenceux King of Arms, died 1597
- Richard Leigh (poet) (1649/50–1728), English poet
- Richard Leigh (footballer) (born 1974), Australian rules footballer
- Richard Leigh (author) (1943–2007), co-author of The Holy Blood and the Holy Grail
- Richard Leigh (songwriter) (born 1951), American country music songwriter
- Richard Leigh (musician), free-improvising musician, member of the Musics collective
- Richard H. Leigh, U.S. Navy admiral
- Richard Leigh Jr (1784–1841), English cricketer
- Richard Leigh (cricket patron), 18th-century English businessman and cricket patron
- Richard "Beaver Dick" Leigh, English-American trapper, scout, and guide

== See also ==
- Richard Lee (disambiguation)
