= Randall Wolf =

American surgeon (born 1953)

- Born: February 5, 1953 (age 73); Cincinnati, Ohio, U.S.
- Education: Indiana University B.A. (1975), Indiana University School of Medicine M.D. (1979)
- Occupations: Physician, Magician
- Known for: Atrial Fibrillation, Wolf Mini Maze
- Website: wolfminimaze.com

Randall K. Wolf (born 5 February 1953) is an American cardiothoracic surgeon, inventor, former radio personality, and magician. He is the creator of the Wolf Mini Maze, a procedure used to correct atrial fibrillation (AF). Wolf previously hosted a weekly radio show, "Take Charge of Your Health" on WKRC (AM) in Cincinnati, Ohio, from 2011 to 2014.

== Medical career ==
Wolf serves on the Global Medical Advisory Board of StopAfib.org, a patient-to-patient resource to control atrial fibrillation. Currently, Wolf is a member of the DeBakey Heart and Vascular Center, Houston Methodist Hospital, Texas Medical Center. He is the arrhythmia specialist in the DeBakey group. He will be serving as faculty member for the 10th Annual Re-Evolution Summit for Minimally Invasive Cardiac Surgery hosted by the Debakey Institute for Cardiovascular Education and Training on April 4–5, 2019. Wolf served as Lt. Col. Chuck Miller's cardiac surgeon, as noted in Col. Miller's most recent book Soaring With Destiny.

In 2015, Wolf relocated the Atrial Fibrillation Center to Houston, Texas where he was featured on Fox 26 News. He served as visiting professor to the University of Texas from 2015 to 2018.

In 2012, Wolf inaugurated the Atrial Fibrillation Center at The Indiana Heart Hospital in Indianapolis, Indiana where he served as Co-director of the Atrial Fibrillation Center until 2014.

Wolf returned to the University of Cincinnati as professor of surgery and biomedical engineering from 2003 to 2007. While at UC, Dr. Wolf served as the 2006 President of the International Society of Minimially Invasive Cardiothoracic Surgery (ISMICS) and the 2007 President of the 21st Century Cardiothoracic Surgery Society (21CCSS).

He also has served as director of the minimally invasive surgery project at Ohio State University from 1998 to 2003. Dr. Wolf helped pioneer the coronary bypass procedure using the da Vinci Surgical System while at Ohio State.

Wolf was featured on the PBS show Scientific American Frontiers hosted by Alan Alda on the show's January 23, 2001 episode "Affairs of the Heart."

== Radio ==
Wolf hosted a weekly radio show, "Take Charge of Your Health," on WKRC (AM) based out of Cincinnati from 2011 to 2014. The show aired from 6 to 7 PM EST Sunday nights.

The show discussed important health topics with in-studio physician specialists from around the world.

== Magic ==
Dr. Wolf is professional magician and magician member of the Academy of Magical Arts. He continues to perform for events in the United States and points beyond.

== Print and Press ==
Wolf has published over 100 peer-reviewed articles, book chapters and invited commentaries in medical journals. See publication list.

Publication	Year(s) Published
American Heart Journal	2005
The Annals of Thoracic Surgery	1997, 1998, 1999, 2000, 2002, 2004, 2005, 2006, 2007, 2008
Atlas of Endoscopic Spine Surgery	1995
Atlas of Minimally Invasive Thoracic Surgery	2011
Cardiology	1986
Cardiovascular Journal of Southern Africa	1997
Catheritization and Cardiovascular Diagnosis	1995
Clinical Orthopaedics and Related Research (CORR)	2005
Conn's Current Therapy	1994
European Journal of Cardio-Thoracic Surgery	1998, 2001, 2002, 2004
The Heart Surgery Forum	2000
The Japanese Journal of Vascular Surgery	2001
Journal of Cardiovascular Surgery	1989, 2003
Journal of Endoscopic Surgery	1998
Journal of Heart Transplant	1987
Journal of the Indiana State Medical Association	1981
Journal of Thoracic Cardiovascular Surgery	1999, 2001, 2002, 2003
Journal of Thoracic and Cardioversion	2005
Journal of Vascular Surgery	1986
Illustrated Minimally Invasive Coronary Artery Bypass Grafting	1998
Minimal Access Cardiovascular Surgery	1999
Minimally Invasive Cardiac Surgery	1999
Minimally Invasive Therapy and Allied Technologies	2004
Operative Techniques in Thoracic and Cardiovascular Surgery	2001
Progress in Cardiovascular Diseases	2005
Ortho Clinics	1998
Seminars on Thoracic and Cardiovascular Surgery	1998
Spine	1997, 2004
Surgical Endoscopy	1999, 2003
Surgical Gynecology Obstetrics Journal	1987
Thoracic Surgery	2001, 2002
Thoracoscopic Spine Surgery	1998

== Honors and awards ==
Honor or Award	Year(s) Received
Phi Beta Kappa, Indiana University	1975
Academic Standards Committee, Indiana University Medical Center	1977, 1978
Innovator of the Year, Cincinnati Business Courier	2006
Honorary Professor Capital University Beijing	2006
Ethicon-Endosurgery Chair for Innovation in Surgery	2006
Top Doc in Cincinnati	2007
Most Compassionate Doctor Award	2012
Top Doc in Indianapolis	2012

== Patents ==
US Patent	Date Received
US06066144; Surgical anastomosis method	May 23, 2000
US06013027; Method for a tissue stabilization device during surgery	January 11, 2000
