= Ligament of Marshall =

Body part near pulmonary vein

The Ligament of Marshall (LoM) is a complex of muscle bundles, blood vessels, adipose tissue, fibrous structure, ganglia, and nerves between the left atrial appendage and the left superior pulmonary vein. The LoM consists of the Vein of Marshall (VoM), a band of muscle called to Marshall Bundle (MB), and the epicardial ganglionated plexi.

Ligament is fibrous connective tissue between bones, so "ligament" in "Ligament of Marshall" is a misnomer.

== Atrial fibrillation ==
Pulmonary vein isolation has been the mainstay of atrial fibrillation reduction, but in many cases there are other sources of arrhythmia, including the LoM. Use of ethanol through the VoM has been shown to be an effective way to reduce atrial fibrillation.

== Discovery ==
The LoM was discovered in 1850 by British surgeon John Marshall, which was later named in his honor.
