= Pulsed field ablation =

Medical procedure

Pulsed field ablation (PFA) is a non-thermal (not using extreme heat or cold) method of biological ablation (removal of structure or functionality) utilizing high-amplitude pulsed (microsecond duration) electric fields to create irreversible electroporation in tissues. It is used most widely to treat tumors (cancer) or cardiac arrhythmias.

== Background ==
Atrial fibrillation frequently results from bursts of tachycardia that originate in muscle bundles extending from the atrium to the pulmonary veins. Pulmonary vein isolation ablation technology has used thermal methods (radiofrequency ablation or, less often, cryoablation) to destroy pulmonary vein cells. As with thermal methods of ablation, in pulsed field ablation, a thin, flexible tube (catheter) is inserted into a blood vessel in the groin and threaded up into the heart to ablate the areas of the pulmonary vein causing excessively rapid electrical signals.

== Advantages ==
A major reason for recurrence of atrial fibrillation after ablation has been the belief of electrical pulmonary vein reconnection, which has not been seen for PFA. In one study, atrial fibrillation recurrence in the thermal ablation group was 39% compared to 11% in the PFA group. PFA can achieve pulmonary vein isolation faster than other ablation methods. Compared to radiofrequency ablation, PFA produces lesions of greater uniformity.

== Safety ==
Cell death following PFA is usually due to apoptosis, which is a far less damaging and inflammatory form of cell death than necrosis. In contrast to thermal methods of ablation, PFA specifically kills cardiomyocytes (cardiac muscle cells) without injuring surrounding tissues. Thermal ablation methods can damage the esophagus, phrenic nerve, and coronary vessels (as high as 5%), which are spared by PFA. One study showed an overall complication rate of 0.7% for PFA and no occurrence of phrenic nerve, esophageal, or pulmonary vein injury.

== Challenges ==
Because PFA is a relatively newer ablation technique, there is a lack of uniformity in the parameters for its delivery. Better standardization could help reduce instances of coronary artery spasm and pulmonary artery hemorrhage, which can occur. The equipment cost and lack of specialized training have limited the widespread use of PFA, making it unavailable to many patients.

Recent (2024) comparisons of PFA with thermal methods have shown reduced time spent in surgery, but no superiority in safety and no better reduction of atrial fibrillation. When used in areas other than the pulmonary vein, injuries have been seen.

== Commercial ==
There are several commercial systems in use or pending release:

- FaraPulse by Boston Scientific
- PulseSelect by Medtronic
- Varipulse by Biosense Webster
