= Richard Lee =

Richard Lee may refer to:

== Politicians ==
- Sir Richard Lee (engineer) (1513–1575), military engineer and MP for Hertfordshire
- Richard Lee (MP for City of London) for City of London
- Richard Lee (MP for Much Wenlock) (fl. 1501–1557), MP for Much Wenlock
- Richard Lee (died 1608), English politician and ambassador to Russia
- Richard Lee (MP for Rochester) (fl. 1621–1653), English politician, MP for Rochester
- Sir Richard Lee, 2nd Baronet (c. 1600–1660), English politician
- Col. Richard Lee I (1617–1664), "the Immigrant", planter, trader, and Secretary of State, who emigrated from England to Virginia
- Col. Richard Lee II (1647–1715), planter, Colonel of Horse, member of the King's Council
- Richard "Squire" Lee (1726–1795), Virginian colonist and politician
- Richard Henry Lee (1732–1794), signer of the American Declaration of Independence
- Richard Bland Lee (1761–1827), U.S. congressman from Virginia
- Richard Henry Lee (Massachusetts politician) (1901–1986)
- Richard C. Lee (1916–2003), mayor of New Haven, Connecticut
- Richard Lee (Canadian politician) (born 1954), BC Liberal MLA for Burnaby North

== Sports ==
- Richard Lee (cricketer, born 1950), Australian cricketer and businessman
- Richard Lee (footballer) (born 1982), goalkeeper who plays for Brentford F.C.
- Richard H. Lee (golfer) (born 1987), American golfer
- Richard T. Lee (golfer) (born 1990), Canadian golfer
- Richard Lee (cricketer, born 1833) (1833–1876), English cricketer a.k.a. Richard Napoleon Thornton
- Richie Lee (born 1959), Irish Gaelic footballer

== Others ==
- Richard Lee (Royal Navy officer) (c. 1765–1837), British admiral
- Richard Lee (RAF officer) (1917–1940), British flying ace of the Second World War
- Richard Borshay Lee (born 1937), Canadian anthropologist and author
- Richard Lee (journalist) (born 1963), Seattle journalist and political candidate, best known for his theories about Kurt Cobain's death
- Brandon Paris (Richard Lee, born 1971), Canadian rock singer
- Richard Lee (activist) (1962–2025), marijuana activist and founder of Oaksterdam University
- Richard Lee (surgeon), American cardiac surgeon
- Richard Charles Lee (1905–1983), Hong Kong businessman and philanthropist
- Richard Nelson Lee (1806–1872), English actor, theatre manager and playwright
- Ric Lee (born 1945), British rock drummer
- Rich Lee (born 1978), American filmmaker
- R. C. T. Lee (Richard C. T. Lee, born 1939), Taiwanese computer scientist
- SS Richard Henry Lee, a Liberty ship

== See also ==
- Dick Lee (disambiguation)
- Rick Lee, former member of NYC band Skeleton Key
- Ricky Lee (born 1948), Filipino screenwriter
- Dickey Lee (born 1936), American singer/songwriter
- Richard Leigh (disambiguation)
- Richard Li (born 1966), Hong Kong businessman
- Li Han-hsiang (1926–1996), known as Richard Li Han Hsiang, Chinese film director
- Lee Richard (1948–2023), Major League Baseball player
