= Dick Lee (disambiguation) =

Dick Lee (born 1956) is a Singaporean pop singer, composer and playwright.

Dick Lee may also refer to:

- Dick Lee (Australian footballer) (1889–1968), Australian rules footballer
- Dick Lee (footballer, born 1944), English footballer
- Dick Lee (basketball), American basketball player and public relations worker
- Dick Lee Ming-kwai (born 1950), former Commissioner of Hong Kong Police

== See also ==
- Richard Lee (disambiguation)
- Dickey Lee (born 1936), American singer
