= Effective refractory period =

Electrocardiography concept

Image of a myocardial action potential. Effective refractory period in green.

In electrocardiography, during a cardiac cycle, once an action potential is initiated, there is a period of time that a new action potential cannot be initiated. This is termed the effective refractory period (ERP) of the tissue. This period is approximately equal to the absolute refractory period (ARP), it occurs because the fast sodium channels remain closed until the cell fully repolarizes. During this period, depolarization on adjacent cardiac muscles does not produce a new depolarization in the current cell as it has to refract back to phase 4 of the action potential before a new action potential can activate it. ERP acts as a protective mechanism and keeps the heart rate in check and prevents arrhythmias, and it helps coordinates muscle contraction. Anti-arrhythmic agents used for arrhythmias usually prolong the ERP. For the treatment of atrial fibrillation, it is a problem that the prolongation of the ERP by these agents also affects the ventricles, which can induce other types of arrhythmias.
