= Cox maze procedure =

Type of heart surgery

- Other names: Maze procedure
- ICD-9-CM: 37.33

The Cox maze procedure, also known as maze procedure, is a type of heart surgery for atrial fibrillation.

"Maze" refers to the series of incisions arranged in a maze-like pattern in the atria. Today, various methods of minimally invasive maze procedures, collectively named minimaze procedures, are used.

== History ==
The maze procedure was developed by James Cox, an American cardiothoracic surgeon. Cox and his associates at Duke University Hospital, and later at Washington University School of Medicine developed the "maze" or "Cox maze" procedure, a cardiac surgery procedure intended to eliminate atrial fibrillation (AF). The first such procedure was performed at St. Louis' Barnes Hospital—now Barnes-Jewish Hospital—in 1987.

The intention was to eliminate AF by using incisional scars to block abnormal electrical circuits (atrial macroreentry) that initiate and perpetuate the abnormal electrical waves of AF. This required an extensive series of full-thickness incisions through the walls of both atria, a median sternotomy (vertical incision through the sternum), and cardiopulmonary bypass (heart-lung machine; extracorporeal circulation). After the introduction of the initial procedure, a series of improvements were made, culminating in 1992 in the Cox maze III procedure, which is now considered to be the "gold standard" for effective surgical cure of AF. It was quite successful in eliminating AF but had drawbacks as well. The Cox maze III is sometimes referred to as the "traditional maze", the "cut-and-sew maze", or simply the "maze". Damiano and colleagues have described a Cox-Maze IV procedure in 2002 in which they modified the Cox-Maze III technique using a combination of bipolar radiofrequency and cryothermal ablation lines. Since then, the Cox-Maze IV procedure is the gold standard surgical treatment for AF with conversion to normal sinus rhythm and freedom from AF at 1 year postoperatively of 93%, but the results are institution dependent.

During the past 10 years, several energy sources, such as unipolar radiofrequency, bipolar radiofrequency, microwave, laser, high-intensity focused ultrasound, and cryothermia, were incorporated into various devices in order to create some of the lesions of the Cox maze III procedure without actually cutting into the atrial walls. Microwave and laser therapy have both been withdrawn from the market, but the other devices continue to be utilized to treat AF surgically.
