= ATS Medical =

ATS Medical, Inc.
- Company type: Public
- Traded as: Nasdaq: ATSI
- Industry: Medical Technology
- Founded: 1992; 34 years ago
- Headquarters: Minneapolis, Minnesota, United States
- Key people: Michael D. Dale (president and CEO)
- Products: Mechanical heart valves
- Revenue: ▲US$75.7M (FY 2009)
- Operating income: ▼US$-3.72M (FY 2009)
- Net income: ▼US$-6.31M (FY 2009)
- Total assets: ▲US$121M (FY 2009)
- Total equity: ▲US$88.9M (FY 2009)
- Number of employees: 245

ATS Medical, Inc. was a developer and manufacturer of products for the cardiac surgery market based in Minneapolis, Minnesota. It was acquired by Medtronic in 2010.

The publicly traded company was founded in 1992 by Manny Villafana, an entrepreneur in the cardiology/cardiac surgery industry. The company introduced a mechanical heart valve incorporating a pivot mechanism consisting of protruding spheres on which the valve’s leaflets pivot to open and close. This was intended to eliminate the cavity created by the pivot of all other bileaflet valves and to improve blood flow through the valve, minimizing potential for blood clot formation. The ATS Open Pivot Heart Valve was first sold in international markets in 1992 and subsequently granted FDA clearance to sell in the United States in 2000. To date more than 140,000 valves have been implanted worldwide.

The company subsequently developed a more diversified cardiac surgery business offering several categories of products:

- Heart Valve Therapy – artificial heart valves (mechanical heart valves and biological heart valves) for aortic valve replacement and mitral valve replacement, and heart valve repair products
- Surgical Cryoablation – cryoablation for the treatment of cardiac arrhythmia
- Surgical Tools and Accessories – surgical tools for the cardiac surgeon in day-to-day surgical procedures including robotic surgery tools and products to meet specific needs during robotic surgery.

In 2010, ATS Medical was acquired by Medtronic.
