= Richard Henry Lee (Massachusetts politician) =

Massachusetts politician (1901–1986)

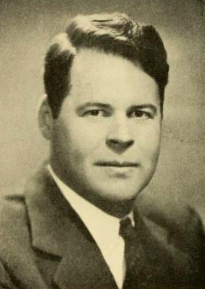
- Portrait of Richard Henry Lee

Member of the Massachusetts House of Representatives from the Massachusetts Senate's Middlesex and Suffolk district district
- In office 1947–1956

Personal details
- Born: December 20, 1901 Dover-Foxcroft, Maine, US
- Died: January 8, 1986 (aged 84) Boston, Massachusetts, US
- Education: Bowdoin College (BA); Harvard Law School (LLB)

Richard Henry Lee (December 20, 1901– January 8, 1986) was an American politician who was the member of the Massachusetts Senate from the Massachusetts Senate's Middlesex and Suffolk district.
