= Intrinsic cardiac nervous system =

Cardiac network of neurons and ganglia

The Intrinsic cardiac nervous system (ICNS), also known as the heart's "little brain," is a complex network of neurons and ganglia embedded within the heart tissue that regulates cardiac function independently of the central nervous system. It modulates heart rate, conduction, and cardiac contractility in response to local and external stimuli. It forms part of the autonomic nervous system.

== Anatomy ==
The ICNS consists of clusters of neurons, or ganglia, primarily located in the atrial and ventricular walls, with higher concentrations in the sinoatrial (SA) and atrioventricular (AV) nodes. These ganglia contain:

- Afferent neurons: Detect mechanical and chemical changes in the heart.
- Efferent neurons: Modulate cardiac muscle activity.
- Interneurons: Facilitate communication within the ICNS.
- The system is organized into ganglionated plexuses (ganglionated plexi or ganlionic plexi; GP), interconnected by nerve fibers, forming a neural network around the heart.

The distribution of ganglia varies across species, with larger mammals (e.g., humans, dogs) having more extensive networks than smaller mammals (e.g., mice, rats).

Cholinergic neurons throughout the GPs project to all areas of the heart. The GP are embedded in the epicardial fat pads, consisting of only a few neurons or as many as 400 neurons.

Post ganglionic neurons from the vagal nerve pathways are components of the Ligament of Marshall, forming part of the "intrinsic" heart nervous system.

There are intrinsic plexi that form part of the autonomic nervous system (ANS), the best known intrinsic plexus being the enteric nervous system. The GP are part of the cardiac intrinsic ANS.

In humans, the ganglia are mostly associated with the posterior or superior aspect of the atria. The ganglia mediate at least some of the effects of vagal nerve stimulation on the sinoatrial node, although don't seem to mediate atrioventricular node conduction.

== Development ==
The ICNS originates from neural crest cells (NCCs) during embryonic development:

- Sympathetic neurons arise from trunk NCCs migrating along the dorsal aorta.
- Parasympathetic neurons derive from vagal NCCs and nodose placodes.
- Key factors like bone morphogenetic proteins (BMPs), PHOX2B, and HAND2 guide differentiation.

== Function ==
The ICNS integrates sensory information from the heart and coordinates local reflexes. Key functions include:

- Heart rate regulation: Adjusts SA node activity in response to stretch or chemical signals.
- Conduction modulation: Influences AV node and Purkinje fiber activity for coordinated contraction.
- Cardioprotection: Responds to ischemia or stress by altering cardiac output.

The ICNS interacts with the autonomic nervous system (ANS), receiving input from sympathetic and parasympathetic pathways, but can operate autonomously during disruptions, such as in heart transplants.

== Physiology ==
ICNS neurons release neurotransmitters like acetylcholine, norepinephrine, and neuropeptides (e.g., substance P, neuropeptide Y, vasoactive intestinal peptide (VIP)). These mediate local signaling and modulate ion channels in cardiac cells, affecting cardiac action potentials and contractility. The system exhibits plasticity, adapting to chronic conditions like heart failure or hypertension.

Vagus nerve stimulation has been shown to inhibit the activity of the GP, possibly through nerves that express Nav1.8 (a sodium channel subtype that is necessary for action potentials in these nerves), but combining GP ablation with pulonary vein isolation may be a superior option.

In animal models, cardiac overload leads to change in the electrophysiological properties of these neurons, leading to the suggestion that such changes might be relevant to the pathophysiology of heart failure.

== Clinical significance ==
Dysfunction in the ICNS is implicated in arrhythmias (atrial fibrillation), sick sinus syndrome, heart failure, and sudden cardiac death. Its role in denervated hearts (e.g., post-transplant) highlights its capacity for independent function. Research explores ICNS-targeted therapies, such as neuromodulation, to treat cardiac disorders.

GP are spatially close to the pulmonary veins, so pulmonary vein isolation necessarily affects the GP. GP has been shown to be a contributor to atrial fibrillation (AFib), such that ablation of the GP has been a strategy for treatment of AFib. GP ablation alone has been shown to eliminate AFib in approximately three-quarter of AFib patients.

Ligation of the left atrial appendage may reduce AFib by alteration of the GP.

== History ==
The ICNS was first described in the 19th century through histological studies of cardiac tissue. Advances in electrophysiology and imaging in the 20th century elucidated its functional role.
