= David Sabiston =

American surgeon (1924–2009)

David C. Sabiston, Jr., M.D.
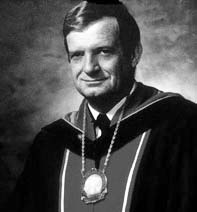
- Dr. David Sabiston
- Born: October 1924; Jacksonville, North Carolina
- Died: January 2009 (age 84); Durham, North Carolina
- Citizenship: U.S.
- Education: University of North Carolina at Chapel Hill; Johns Hopkins University (M.D.)
- Known for: Research in cardiothoracic surgery
- Scientific career
- Fields: Physician; Surgeon; Educator; Author
- Workplaces: Johns Hopkins University; Duke University

David Coston Sabiston Jr. (October 4, 1924 – January 26, 2009) was an early innovator in cardiac surgery. In 1962, he performed a seminal procedure that paved the way for modern coronary bypass surgery, grafting a vein from a patient's leg to bypass a blocked coronary artery during open-heart surgery. The patient died from unrelated complications, but Sabiston's technique and other surgeons' improvements on it led to the development of surgical coronary revascularization as it exists today.

== Early life and education ==
Sabiston was born to David C. Sabiston Sr. and Frances Marie Sabiston (née Jackson) in Jacksonville, NC. He graduated with a B.S. degree in 1944 from the University of North Carolina at Chapel Hill. He was a member of the Phi Beta Kappa honor society. Sabiston then attended Johns Hopkins University School of Medicine, completing his M.D. degree as a member of the Alpha Omega Alpha honor society in 1947. After medical school, Sabiston spent two years as a captain (O3) in the U.S. Army Medical Corps, posted at Walter Reed Medical Center, doing cardiovascular research.

== Career in thoracic surgery ==
After his military service, Sabiston returned to Johns Hopkins University to complete his residency and fellowship training, under the direction of Alfred Blalock. In 1952, he was given an instructorship at Hopkins during his year as a Chief Resident, and then an assistant professorship in Surgery in 1953 with a joint appointment as an Investigator at the Howard Hughes Medical Institute.

In 1961, Sabiston was granted a Fulbright scholarship to study at the Hospital for Sick Children and Nuffield Department of Surgery at the University of Oxford.

Upon his return to the United States, Sabiston joined the Duke University School of Medicine (Durham, NC) in 1964 as James B. Duke Professor and Chairman of the Department of Surgery, a position he held for the next 32 years. Sabiston published almost 300 peer-reviewed papers on various facets of cardiothoracic surgery during his career, as well as over 35 books and many invited book chapters. One of those works, "Sabiston's Textbook of Surgery: the Biological Basis of Modern Surgical Practice," is now in its 22nd edition, currently edited by Drs. Townsend, Beauchamp, Evers, and Mattox. It is still considered the definitive treatise on surgical practice.

Early in his tenure in Durham, Sabiston helped to desegregate the surgical clinics and wards at the Duke University Hospital.

== Accolades and awards ==
He assumed numerous other leadership roles throughout his career, including the Presidency of the American Surgical Association, the American Association for Thoracic Surgery, and the American College of Surgeons. Sabiston was also on the Board of Regents for the last of those organizations, and he served as Editor-in-Chief of the professional journal Annals of Surgery for 27 years. In addition, he received many awards, honorary degrees, and memberships in professional societies across the world. They included the Distinguished Alumnus Award, University of North Carolina, 1978; North Carolina Award in Science Gold Medal (Presented by the Governor of North Carolina), 1978; American Heart Association Scientific Councils' Distinguished Achievement Award, 1983; Michael E. DeBakey Award for Outstanding Achievement, 1984; College Medalist, American College of Chest Physicians, 1987; Honorary Degree, University of Madrid, 1994; Gimbernet Prize, Societat Catalana de Cirurgia, 1994; Honorary Fellowship, European Surgical Association, 1995; The Johns Hopkins University Distinguished Alumnus Award, 1995; Bigelow Medal, Boston Surgical Society, 1996; The Society Prize, the International Surgical Society, 1999; Honorary Member of the Royal College of Surgeons of England; Honorary Member of the Royal College of Surgeons of Edinburgh; Honorary Member of the Royal College of Physicians and Surgeons of Canada; Honorary Member of the German Society of Surgery; Honorary Member of the Royal College of Surgeons of Ireland; Honorary Member of the Royal Australian College of Surgeons; Honorary Member of the Japanese College of Surgeons; Honorary Member of the French Surgical Association; Honorary Member of the Philippine College of Surgeons; Asociacion de Cirugia del Litoral (Argentina); Brazilian College of Surgeons; Spanish Association of Surgeons; and Columbia Surgical Society. The honors that Sabiston was said to have cherished most were teaching awards from the medical students at Duke University, whom he held in the highest regard

== Retirement and death ==
Sabiston retired from medical practice in 1994. He died from the last in a series of three cerebrovascular accidents (strokes) in January 2009 at the age of 84.
