= Atrial fibrillation =

Irregular beating of the atria of the heart

- Other names: Auricular fibrillation
- Electrocardiogram samples displaying atrial fibrillation in the upper recording with absence of P waves (red arrow), an erratic baseline between QRS complexes, and elevated heart rate. Bottom recording shows normal sinus rhythm with P waves (purple arrow)
- Specialty: Cardiology
- Symptoms: None, heart palpitations, fainting, dizziness, decreased level or total loss of consciousness, shortness of breath
- Complications: Heart failure, dementia, stroke
- Usual onset: Age > 50
- Risk factors: High blood pressure, valvular heart disease, coronary artery disease, cardiomyopathy, congenital heart disease, COPD, obesity, smoking, sleep apnea
- Diagnostic method: Feeling the pulse, electrocardiogram
- Differential diagnosis: Irregular heartbeat
- Treatment: Lifestyle modifications, rate control, rhythm control, anticoagulation
- Frequency: 3.5% (developed world), 1.5% (developing world)
- Deaths: 315,000 with atrial flutter (2019)

Atrial fibrillation (AF, AFib or A-fib) is an abnormal heart rhythm (arrhythmia) characterized by rapid and irregular beating of the atrial chambers of the heart. It often begins as short periods of abnormal beating, which become longer or continuous over time. It may also start as other forms of arrhythmia, such as atrial flutter, that transform into AF.

Episodes can be asymptomatic. Symptomatic episodes may involve heart palpitations, fainting, lightheadedness, loss of consciousness, or shortness of breath. Atrial fibrillation is associated with an increased risk of heart failure, dementia, and stroke. It is a type of supraventricular tachycardia.

Atrial fibrillation frequently results from bursts of tachycardia that originate in muscle bundles extending from the atrium to the pulmonary veins. Pulmonary vein isolation by transcatheter ablation can restore sinus rhythm. The ganglionated plexi (autonomic ganglia of the heart atrium and ventricles) can also be a source of atrial fibrillation, and are sometimes also ablated for that reason. Not only the pulmonary vein, but the left atrial appendage and ligament of Marshall can be a source of atrial fibrillation and are also ablated for that reason. As atrial fibrillation becomes more persistent, the junction between the pulmonary veins and the left atrium becomes less of an initiator and the left atrium becomes an independent source of arrhythmias.

High blood pressure and valvular heart disease are the most common modifiable risk factors for AF. Other heart-related risk factors include heart failure, coronary artery disease, cardiomyopathy, and congenital heart disease. In low- and middle-income countries, valvular heart disease is often attributable to rheumatic fever. Lung-related risk factors include COPD, obesity, and sleep apnea. Cortisol and other stress biomarkers, as well as emotional stress, may play a role in the pathogenesis of atrial fibrillation.

Other risk factors include excess alcohol intake, tobacco smoking, diabetes mellitus, subclinical hypothyroidism, and thyrotoxicosis. However, about half of cases are not associated with any of these aforementioned risks. Healthcare professionals might suspect AF after feeling the pulse and confirm the diagnosis by interpreting an electrocardiogram (ECG). A typical ECG in AF shows irregularly spaced QRS complexes without P waves.

Healthy lifestyle changes, such as weight loss in people with obesity, increased physical activity, and drinking less alcohol, can lower the risk for AF and reduce its burden if it occurs. AF is often treated with medications to slow the heart rate to a near-normal range (known as rate control) or to convert the rhythm to normal sinus rhythm (known as rhythm control). Electrical cardioversion can convert AF to normal heart rhythm and is often necessary for emergency use if the person is unstable. Ablation may prevent recurrence in some people. For those at low risk of stroke, AF does not necessarily require blood-thinning though some healthcare providers may prescribe an anti-clotting medication. Most people with AF are at increased risk of stroke. For those at more than low risk, experts generally recommend an anti-clotting medication. Anti-clotting medications include warfarin and direct oral anticoagulants. While these medications reduce stroke risk, they increase rates of major bleeding.

Atrial fibrillation is the most common serious abnormal heart rhythm and, as of 2020, affects more than 33 million people worldwide. As of 2014, it affected about 2 to 3% of the population of Europe and North America. The incidence and prevalence of AF is increasing. In the developing world, about 0.6% of males and 0.4% of females are affected. The percentage of people with AF increases with age with 0.1% under 50 years old, 4% between 60 and 70 years old, and 14% over 80 years old being affected. The first known report of an irregular pulse was by Jean-Baptiste de Sénac in 1749. Thomas Lewis was the first doctor to document this by ECG in 1909.

== Signs and symptoms ==
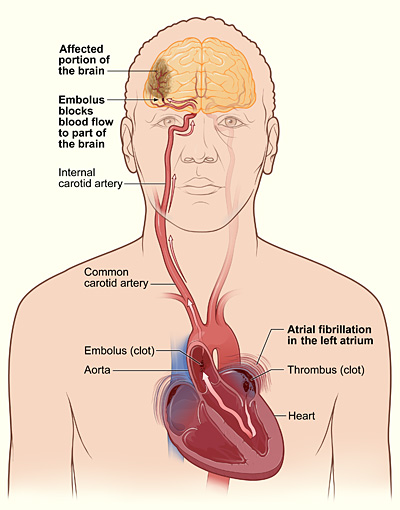
How a stroke can occur during atrial fibrillation

Atrial fibrillation is usually accompanied by symptoms related to a rapid heart rate. Rapid and irregular heart rates may be perceived as the sensation of the heart beating too fast, irregularly, or skipping beats (palpitations) or exercise intolerance.

Other possible symptoms include congestive heart failure symptoms such as fatigue, shortness of breath, or swelling. Loss of consciousness can also occur due to atrial fibrillation, a lack of oxygen, and insufficient blood to the brain. The abnormal heart rhythm (arrhythmia) is sometimes only identified with the onset of a stroke or a transient ischemic attack (TIA). It is not uncommon for a person to first become aware of AF from a routine physical examination or electrocardiogram, as it often does not cause symptoms.

Since most cases of AF are secondary to other medical problems, the presence of chest pain or angina, signs and symptoms of hyperthyroidism (an overactive thyroid gland) such as weight loss and diarrhea, and symptoms suggestive of lung disease can indicate an underlying cause. A history of stroke or TIA, as well as high blood pressure, diabetes, heart failure, or rheumatic fever, may indicate whether someone with AF is at a higher risk of complications.

=== Rapid heart rate ===
Presentation is similar to other forms of tachycardia (rapid heart rate) and may be asymptomatic. Palpitations and chest discomfort are common complaints. The rapid uncoordinated heart rate may result in reduced output of blood pumped by the heart (cardiac output), resulting in inadequate blood flow and, therefore, inadequate oxygen delivery to the rest of the body. Common symptoms of uncontrolled atrial fibrillation may include shortness of breath both when upright and when lying flat, dizziness, and sudden onset of paroxysmal nocturnal dyspnoea, shortness of breath during the night. This may progress to swelling of the lower extremities, a manifestation of congestive heart failure. Due to inadequate cardiac output, individuals with AF may also complain of lightheadedness.

AF can cause respiratory distress due to congestion in the lungs. By definition, the heart rate will be tachycardic. Blood pressure may be variable, and often difficult to measure as the beat-by-beat variability causes problems for most digital (oscillometric) non-invasive blood pressure monitors. For this reason, when determining the heart rate in AF, direct cardiac auscultation is recommended. Low blood pressure is most concerning and a sign that immediate treatment is required. Many of the symptoms associated with uncontrolled atrial fibrillation are manifestations of congestive heart failure due to the reduced cardiac output. The affected person's respiratory rate often increases in the presence of respiratory distress. Pulse oximetry may confirm the presence of too little oxygen reaching the body's tissues, related to any precipitating factors such as pneumonia. Examination of the jugular veins may reveal elevated pressure (jugular venous distention). Examination of the lungs may reveal crackles, which are suggestive of pulmonary edema. Examination of the heart will reveal a rapid, irregular rhythm.

== Causes ==
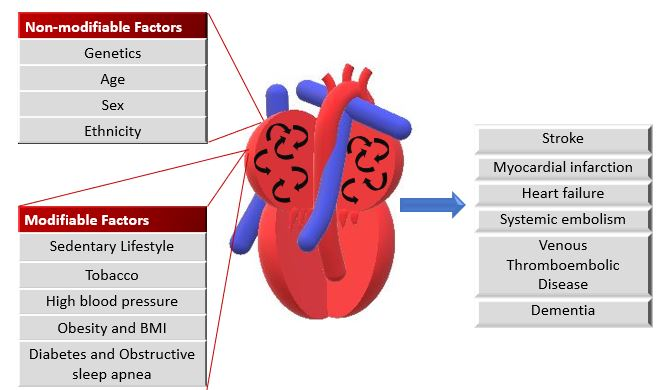
Non-modifiable risk factors (top left box) and modifiable risk factors (bottom left box) for atrial fibrillation. The main outcomes of atrial fibrillation are in the right box. BMI=Body mass index.

AF is linked to several forms of cardiovascular disease, but may occur in otherwise normal hearts. Cardiovascular factors known to be associated with the development of AF include high blood pressure, coronary artery disease, mitral valve stenosis (e.g., due to rheumatic heart disease or mitral valve prolapse), mitral regurgitation, left atrial enlargement, hypertrophic cardiomyopathy, pericarditis, congenital heart disease, and previous heart surgery. People with congenital heart disease tend to develop atrial fibrillation at a younger age, that is more likely to be of right atrial origin (atypical) than of left origin, and have a greater risk of progressing to permanent atrial fibrillation.

Additionally, lung diseases (such as pneumonia, lung cancer, pulmonary embolism, and sarcoidosis) may play a role in certain people. Sepsis also increases the risk of developing new-onset atrial fibrillation. Disorders of breathing during sleep, such as obstructive sleep apnea (OSA), are also associated with AF. OSA, specifically, was found to be a very strong predictor of atrial fibrillation. Patients with OSA were shown to have an increased incidence of atrial fibrillation and a study done by Gami et al. demonstrated that increased nocturnal oxygen desaturation from OSA severity was correlated with higher incidences of atrial fibrillation. Obesity is a risk factor for AF. Hyperthyroidism and subclinical hyperthyroidism are associated with AF development.

Caffeine consumption does not appear to be associated with AF; excessive alcohol consumption ("binge drinking" or "holiday heart syndrome") is linked to AF. Low-to-moderate alcohol consumption also appears to be associated with an increased risk of developing atrial fibrillation, although the increase in risk associated with drinking less than two drinks daily appears to be small. Tobacco smoking and secondhand tobacco smoke exposure are associated with an increased risk of developing atrial fibrillation. Long-term endurance exercise that far exceeds the recommended amount of exercise (e.g., long-distance cycling or marathon running) appears to be associated with a modest increase in the risk of atrial fibrillation in middle-aged and elderly people.

Major stress biomarkers (including cortisol and heat shock proteins) indicate that stress plays a significant role in causing atrial fibrillation. There is some evidence that night shift working may be linked to a diagnosis of AF.

Atrial fibrillation is associated with elevated levels of inflammatory markers and clotting factors. Mendelian randomization indicates a causal relationship of inflammation leading to atrial fibrillation.

=== Genetics ===
Family history in a first-degree relative is associated with a 40% increase in risk of AF. This finding led to the mapping of different loci such as 10q22-24, 6q14-16, and 11p15-5.3 and the discovery of mutations associated with the loci. Mutations have been found in the genes of K^{+} channels and Na^{+} channels, which affect the processes of polarization-depolarization of the myocardium, cellular hyper-excitability, shortening of effective refractory period, favoring re-entries.

Using genome-wide association study (GWAS), which screens the entire genome for single-nucleotide polymorphism (SNP), three susceptibility loci have been found for AF (4q25, 1q21, and 16q22). In these loci there are SNPs associated with a 30% increase in risk of recurrent atrial tachycardia after ablation. There are also SNPs associated with loss of function of the Pitx2c gene (involved in cellular development of pulmonary valves), responsible for re-entries. There are also SNPs close to ZFHX3 genes involved in the regulation of Ca^{2+}. A 2018 meta-analysis of GWAS studies identified 97 locis associated with AF, of which 70 were newly identified associations: they are associated with genes that encode transcription factors, such as TBX3 and TBX5, NKX2-5 or PITX2, involved in the regulation of cardiac conduction, modulation of ion channels and in cardiac development.

=== Sedentary lifestyle ===
A sedentary lifestyle increases the likelihood of having AF risk factors, such as obesity, hypertension, and diabetes mellitus. This favors remodeling processes of the atrium due to inflammation or alterations in the depolarization of cardiomyocytes by elevation of sympathetic nervous system activity. A sedentary lifestyle is associated with an increased risk of AF compared to physical activity. In both men and women, the practice of moderate exercise reduces the risk of AF progressively; intense sports may increase the risk of developing AF, as seen in athletes. It is due to a remodeling of cardiac tissue, and an increase in vagal tone, which shortens the effective refractory period (ERP) favoring re-entries from the pulmonary veins.

=== Tobacco ===
The rate of AF in smokers is 1.4 times higher than in non-smokers. Snus consumption, which delivers nicotine at a dose equivalent to that of cigarettes, is not correlated with AF.

=== Alcohol ===
Acute alcohol consumption can directly trigger an episode of atrial fibrillation. Regular alcohol consumption also increases the risk of atrial fibrillation in several ways. The long-term use of alcohol alters the physical structure and electrical properties of the atria. Alcohol consumption does this by repeatedly stimulating the sympathetic nervous system, increasing inflammation in the atria, raising blood pressure, lowering the levels of potassium and magnesium in the blood, worsening obstructive sleep apnea, and by promoting harmful structural changes (remodeling) in the atria and ventricles of the heart. This remodeling leads to abnormally increased pressure in the left atrium, inappropriately dilates it, and increases scarring (fibrosis) in the left atrium. The aforementioned structural changes increase the risk of developing atrial fibrillation when paired with the harmful changes in how the left atrium conducts electricity.

=== Hypertension ===
Hypertension is reportedly present in 49% to 90% of patients with atrial fibrillation. According to the CHARGE Consortium, both systolic and diastolic blood pressure are predictors of the risk of AF. Systolic blood pressure values close to normal reduce the increased risk associated with AF. Diastolic dysfunction is also associated with AF, which increases left atrial pressure, left atrial volume, size, and left ventricular hypertrophy, characteristic of chronic hypertension. All atrial remodeling is related to heterogeneous conduction and the formation of re-entrant electric conduction from the pulmonary veins.

=== Other diseases ===
There is a relationship between risk factors such as obesity and hypertension, with the appearance of diseases such as diabetes mellitus and sleep apnea-hypopnea syndrome, specifically, obstructive sleep apnea (OSA). These diseases are associated with an increased risk of AF due to their remodeling effects on the left atrium.

=== Medications ===
Several medications are associated with an increased risk of developing atrial fibrillation. Few studies have examined this phenomenon, and the exact incidence of medication-induced atrial fibrillation is unknown. Medications that are commonly associated with an increased risk of developing atrial fibrillation include dobutamine and the chemotherapy agent cisplatin. Agents associated with a moderately increased risk include nonsteroidal anti-inflammatory drugs (such as ibuprofen), bisphosphonates, and other chemotherapeutic agents such as melphalan, interleukin-2, and anthracyclines. Other medications that rarely increase the risk of developing atrial fibrillation include adenosine, aminophylline, corticosteroids, ivabradine, ondansetron, and antipsychotics. This form of atrial fibrillation occurs in people of all ages but is most common in the elderly, in those with other atrial fibrillation risk factors, and after heart surgery.

== Pathophysiology ==
The normal electrical conduction system of the heart allows electrical impulses generated by the heart's own pacemaker (the sinoatrial node) to spread to and stimulate the muscular layer of the heart (myocardium) in both the atria and the ventricles. When the myocardium is stimulated, it contracts, and if this occurs in an orderly manner allows blood to be pumped to the body. In AF, the normal regular electrical impulses generated by the sinoatrial node are overwhelmed by disorganized electrical waves, usually originating from the roots of the pulmonary veins. These disorganized waves conduct intermittently through the atrioventricular node, leading to irregular activation of the ventricles that generate the heartbeat.

=== Pathology ===
The primary pathologic change seen in atrial fibrillation is the progressive fibrosis of the atria. This fibrosis is due primarily to atrial dilation; however, genetic causes and inflammation may be factors in some individuals. Dilation of the atria can be due to almost any structural abnormality of the heart that can cause a rise in the pressure within the heart. This includes valvular heart disease (such as mitral stenosis, mitral regurgitation, and tricuspid regurgitation), hypertension, and congestive heart failure. Any inflammatory state that affects the heart can cause atrial fibrosis.

Once dilation of the atria has occurred, this begins a chain of events that leads to the activation of the renin–angiotensin–aldosterone system (RAAS) and subsequent increase in the matrix metalloproteinases and disintegrin, which leads to atrial remodeling and fibrosis, with loss of atrial muscle mass. This process occurs gradually, and experimental studies have revealed that patchy atrial fibrosis may precede the occurrence of atrial fibrillation and may progress with prolonged durations of atrial fibrillation.

Fibrosis is not limited to the muscle mass of the atria and may occur in the sinus node (SA node) and atrioventricular node (AV node), correlating with sick sinus syndrome. Prolonged episodes of atrial fibrillation have been shown to correlate with prolongation of the sinus node recovery time; this suggests that dysfunction of the SA node is progressive with prolonged episodes of atrial fibrillation.

Along with fibrosis, alterations in the atria that predispose to atrial fibrillation affect their electrical properties, as well as their responsiveness to the autonomic nervous system. The atrial remodeling that includes the pathologic changes described above has been referred to as atrial myopathy.

=== Electrophysiology ===
Conduction
Sinus rhythm

Atrial fibrillation

There are multiple theories about the cause of atrial fibrillation. An important theory is that the regular impulses produced by the sinus node for a normal heartbeat are overwhelmed by rapid electrical discharges produced in the atria and adjacent parts of the pulmonary veins. Non-pulmonary vein sources of triggers for atrial fibrillation have been identified in 10% to 33% of patients. These triggers include the coronary sinus, the posterior wall of the left atrium, the ligament of Marshall, and the left atrial appendage.

Sources of these disturbances are either automatic foci, often localized at one of the pulmonary veins, or a small number of localized sources in the form of either a re-entrant leading circle or electrical spiral waves (rotors); these localized sources may be in the left atrium near the pulmonary veins or in a variety of other locations through both the left or right atrium. Three fundamental components favor the establishment of a leading circle or a rotor: slow conduction velocity of the cardiac action potential, a short refractory period, and a small wavelength. Meanwhile, the wavelength is the product of velocity and refractory period. If the action potential has fast conduction, with a long refractory period and/or conduction pathway shorter than the wavelength, an AF focus would not be established. In multiple wavelet theory, a wavefront will break into smaller daughter wavelets when encountering an obstacle, through a process called vortex shedding. But, under the proper conditions, such wavelets can reform and spin around a center, forming an AF focus.

In a heart with AF, the increased calcium release from the sarcoplasmic reticulum and increased calcium sensitivity can lead to an accumulation of intracellular calcium and cause downregulation of L-type calcium channels. This reduces the duration of the action potential and the refractory period, thus favoring the conduction of re-entrant waves. Increased expression of inward-rectifier potassium ion channels can cause a reduced atrial refractory period and wavelength. The abnormal distribution of gap junction proteins such as GJA1 (also known as connexin 43), and GJA5 (connexin 40), causes non-uniformity of electrical conduction, thus causing the arrhythmia.

AF can be distinguished from atrial flutter (AFL), which appears as an organized electrical circuit usually in the right atrium. AFL produces characteristic saw-toothed F-waves of constant amplitude and frequency on an ECG, whereas AF does not. In AFL, the discharges circulate rapidly at a rate of 300 beats per minute (bpm) around the atrium. In AF, there is no such regularity, except at the sources where the local activation rate can exceed 500 bpm. Although AF and atrial flutter are distinct arrhythmias, atrial flutter may degenerate into AF, and an individual may experience both arrhythmias at different times.

Although the electrical impulses of AF occur at a fast rate, most of them do not result in a heartbeat. A heartbeat results when an electrical impulse from the atria passes through the atrioventricular (AV) node to the ventricles and causes them to contract. During AF, if all of the impulses from the atria passed through the AV node, there would be severe ventricular tachycardia, resulting in a severe reduction of cardiac output. This dangerous situation is prevented by the AV node since its limited conduction velocity reduces the rate at which impulses reach the ventricles during AF.

== Diagnosis ==
A 12-lead ECG showing atrial fibrillation at approximately 132 beats per minute

Diagram of normal sinus rhythm as seen on ECG. In atrial fibrillation, the P waves, which represent depolarization of the top of the heart, are absent.

Atrial fibrillation is diagnosed on an electrocardiogram (ECG/EKG). The evaluation of atrial fibrillation involves a determination of the cause of the arrhythmia and classification of the arrhythmia. Diagnostic investigation of AF typically includes a complete medical history and physical examination, ECG, transthoracic echocardiogram, and blood tests.

=== Screening ===
Numerous guidelines recommend opportunistic screening for atrial fibrillation in those 65 years and older. These organizations include the: European Society of Cardiology, National Heart Foundation of Australia and the Cardiac Society of Australia and New Zealand, European Heart Rhythm Society, AF-SCREEN International Collaboration, Royal College of Physicians of Edinburgh European Primary Care Cardiovascular Society, and Irish Health Information and Quality Authority.

Single-timepoint screening detects undiagnosed AF, which is often asymptomatic, in approximately 1.4% of people aged 65 years and older. In 2022, the United States Preventive Services Task Force found insufficient evidence to determine the usefulness of routine screening.

Some smartwatches may detect AF.

==== Bloodwork ====
Blood tests such as complete blood count, kidney function, electrolytes, glucose or HbA1c, and thyroid function is often determined in new-onset atrial fibrillation, to provide risk stratification and exclude certain etiology.

==== Electrocardiogram ====
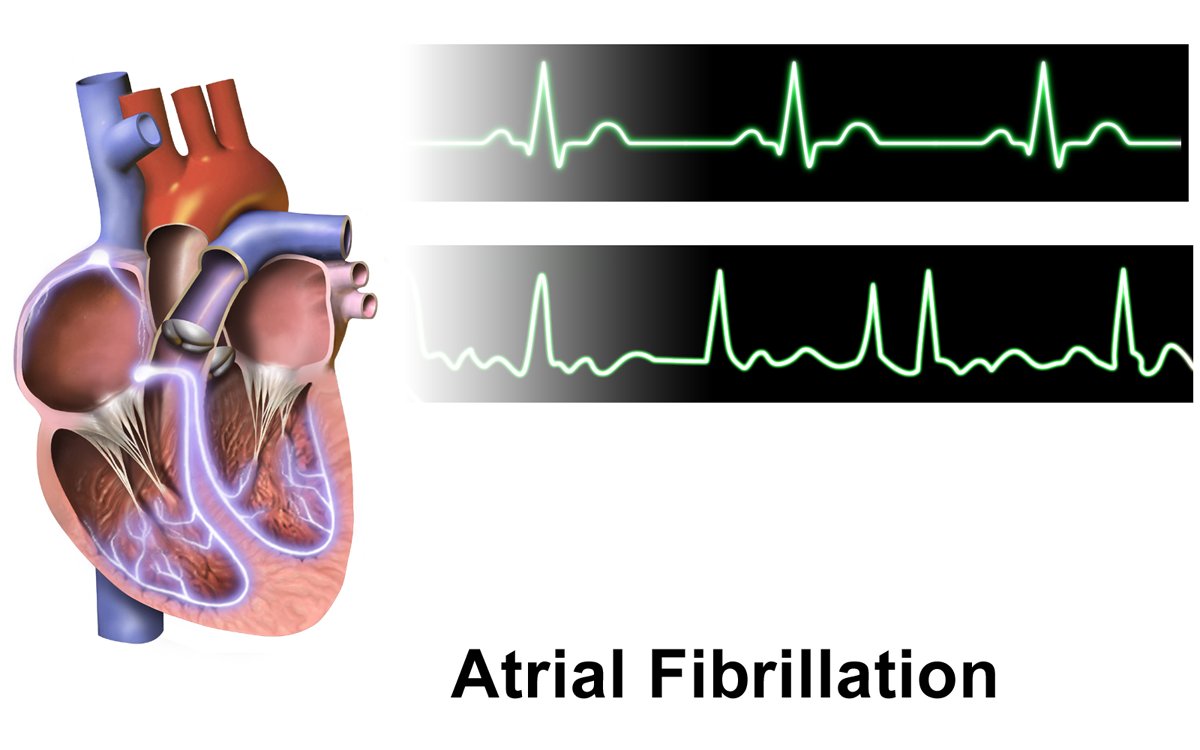
ECG recordings of normal sinus rhythm (top) with atrial fibrillation and absence of P waves (bottom)

Atrial fibrillation is diagnosed on an electrocardiogram (ECG), an investigation performed routinely whenever an irregular heartbeat is suspected. Characteristic findings are the absence of P waves, with disorganized electrical activity in their place, and irregular R–R intervals due to irregular conduction of impulses to the ventricles. At very fast heart rates, atrial fibrillation may look more regular, which may make it more difficult to separate from other supraventricular tachycardias or ventricular tachycardia.

QRS complexes should be narrow, signifying that they are initiated by normal conduction of atrial electrical activity through the intraventricular conduction system. Wide QRS complexes are worrisome for ventricular tachycardia, although, in cases where there is a disease of the conduction system, wide complexes may be present in A-fib with a rapid ventricular response.

If paroxysmal AF is suspected, but an ECG during an office visit shows only a regular rhythm, AF episodes may be detected and documented with the use of ambulatory Holter monitoring (e.g., for a day). If the episodes are too infrequent to be detected by Holter monitoring with reasonable probability, then the person can be monitored for longer periods (e.g., a month) with an ambulatory event monitor.

==== Echocardiography ====
In general, a non-invasive transthoracic echocardiogram (TTE) is performed in newly diagnosed AF, as well as if there is a major change in the person's clinical state. This ultrasound-based scan of the heart may help identify valvular heart disease (which may greatly increase the risk of stroke and alter recommendations for the appropriate type of anticoagulation), left and right atrial size (which predicts the likelihood that AF may become permanent), left ventricular size and function, peak right ventricular pressure (pulmonary hypertension), presence of left atrial thrombus (low sensitivity), presence of left ventricular hypertrophy and pericardial disease.

Significant enlargement of both the left and right atria is associated with long-standing atrial fibrillation and, if noted at the initial presentation of atrial fibrillation, suggests that the atrial fibrillation is likely to be of a longer duration than the individual's symptoms.

==== Transesophageal echocardiogram ====
A regular echocardiogram (transthoracic echocardiogram; TTE) has a low sensitivity for identifying blood clots in the heart. If this is suspected (e.g., when planning urgent electrical cardioversion), a transesophageal echocardiogram (TEE, or TOE where British spelling is used) is preferred.

The TEE has much better visualization of the left atrial appendage than transthoracic echocardiography. This structure, located in the left atrium, is the place where a blood clot forms in more than 90% of cases in non-valvular (or non-rheumatic) atrial fibrillation. TEE has a high sensitivity for locating thrombi in this area and can also detect sluggish blood flow in this area that is suggestive of blood clot formation. If a blood clot is seen on TEE, then cardioversion is contraindicated due to the risk of stroke, and anticoagulation is recommended.

==== Ambulatory Holter monitoring ====
A Holter monitor is a wearable ambulatory heart monitor that continuously monitors the heart rate and heart rhythm for a short duration, typically 24 hours. In individuals with symptoms of significant shortness of breath with exertion or palpitations regularly, a Holter monitor may be of benefit to determine whether rapid heart rates (or unusually slow heart rates) during atrial fibrillation are the cause of the symptoms.

=== Classification ===
Classification system
AF category	Defining characteristics
First detected	only one diagnosed episode
Paroxysmal	recurrent episodes that stop on their own in less than seven days
Persistent	recurrent episodes that last more than seven days
Long-standing Persistent	recurrent episodes that last more than twelve months
Permanent	AF that has been accepted, and for which a sole rate control strategy has been decided upon.

The American College of Cardiology (ACC), American Heart Association (AHA), and the European Society of Cardiology (ESC) recommend in their guidelines the following classification system based on simplicity and clinical relevance.

All people with AF are initially in the category called first detected AF. These people may or may not have had previous undetected episodes. If a first detected episode stops on its own within seven days and then another episode begins later, the category changes to paroxysmal AF. Although people in this category have episodes lasting up to seven days, in most cases of paroxysmal AF, the episodes will stop in less than 24 hours. If the episode lasts for more than seven days, it is unlikely to stop on its own and is then known as persistent AF. In this case, cardioversion can be attempted to restore a normal rhythm. If an episode continues for a year or more, the rhythm is then known as long-standing persistent AF. If a person and their medical team decide to accept persistent AF and not attempt restoration of a normal sinus rhythm but instead manage the AF by simply controlling the person's ventricular rate, then the rhythm is referred to as permanent AF. As a further subtype, AF detected only by an implanted or wearable cardiac monitor is known as subclinical AF.

Episodes that last less than 30 seconds are not considered in this classification system. Also, this system does not apply to cases where the AF is a secondary condition that occurs in the setting of a primary condition that may be the cause of the AF.

About half of people with AF have permanent AF, while a quarter have paroxysmal AF, and a quarter have persistent AF.

In addition to the above AF categories, which are mainly defined by episode timing and termination, the ACC/AHA and ESC guidelines describe additional outdated AF categories in terms of other characteristics of the person. Valvular AF refers to AF attributable to moderate to severe mitral valve stenosis or atrial fibrillation in the presence of a mechanical artificial heart valve. This distinction may be useful as it has implications on appropriate treatment, including differing recommendations for anticoagulation, but the term is discouraged as it may be confusing. Other historically used definitions include lone AF – AF occurring in those aged under 60 in the absence of other cardiovascular or respiratory diseases. This description is also discouraged since it offers no clinical value. Secondary AF refers to AF that occurs in the setting of another condition that have caused the AF, such as acute myocardial infarction, cardiac surgery, pericarditis, myocarditis, hyperthyroidism, pulmonary embolism, pneumonia, or another acute pulmonary disease.

== Prevention ==
Prevention of atrial fibrillation focuses primarily on preventing or controlling its risk factors. Many of its risk factors, such as obesity, smoking, lack of physical activity, and excessive alcohol consumption, are modifiable and preventable with lifestyle modification or can be managed by a healthcare professional.

=== Lifestyle modification ===
Several healthy lifestyle behaviors are associated with a lower likelihood of developing atrial fibrillation. Accordingly, consensus guidelines recommend abstaining from alcohol and recreational drugs, stopping tobacco use, maintaining a healthy weight, and regularly participating in moderate-intensity physical activities. Consistent moderate-intensity aerobic exercise, defined as achieving 3.0–5.9 METs of intensity, for at least 150 minutes per week may reduce the risk of developing new-onset atrial fibrillation. Few studies have examined the role of specific dietary changes and how it relates to the prevention of atrial fibrillation.

== Management ==
The main goals of treatment are to prevent circulatory instability and stroke. Rate or rhythm control is used to achieve the former, whereas anticoagulation is used to decrease the risk of the latter. If cardiovascularly unstable due to uncontrolled tachycardia, immediate cardioversion is indicated. Many antiarrhythmics, when used long term, increase the risk of death without any meaningful benefit. An integrated management approach, which includes stroke prevention, symptoms control and management of associated comorbidities has been associated with better outcomes in patients with atrial fibrillation.

This holistic or integrated care approach is summed up as the ABC (Atrial fibrillation Better Care) pathway, as follows:

- A: Avoid stroke with Anticoagulation, where the default is stroke prevention unless the patient is at low risk. Stroke prevention means use of oral anticoagulation (OAC), whether with well managed vitamin K antagonists (VKA), with time in therapeutic range >70%, or more commonly, label-adherent dosed direct oral anticoagulant (DOAC).
- B: Better symptom and atrial fibrillation management with patient-centred, symptom-directed decisions on rate control or rhythm control. In some selected patients, use of early rhythm control may be beneficial.
- C: Cardiovascular risk factor and comorbidity management, including attention to lifestyle factors and psychological morbidity.

=== Lifestyle modification ===
Regular aerobic exercise improves atrial fibrillation symptoms and AF-related quality of life. The effect of high-intensity interval training on reducing atrial fibrillation burden is unclear. Weight loss of at least 10% is associated with reduced atrial fibrillation burden in people who are overweight or obese.

=== Comorbidity treatment ===
For people who have both atrial fibrillation and obstructive sleep apnea, observational studies suggest that continuous positive airway pressure (CPAP) treatment appears to lower the risk of atrial fibrillation recurrence after undergoing ablation. Randomized controlled trials examining the role of obstructive sleep apnea treatment on atrial fibrillation incidence and burden are lacking. Guideline-recommended lifestyle and medical interventions are recommended for people with atrial fibrillation and coexisting conditions such as hyperlipidemia, diabetes mellitus, or hypertension without specific blood sugar or blood pressure targets for people with atrial fibrillation.

Bariatric surgery may reduce the risk of new-onset atrial fibrillation in people with obesity without AF and may reduce the risk of a recurrence of AF after an ablation procedure in people with coexisting obesity and atrial fibrillation. It is important for all people with atrial fibrillation to optimize the control of all coexisting medical conditions that can worsen their atrial fibrillation, such as hyperthyroidism, diabetes, congestive heart failure, high blood pressure, chronic obstructive pulmonary disease, stimulant use (e.g., methamphetamine dependence), and excessive alcohol consumption.

=== Anticoagulants ===
Anticoagulation medication can be used to reduce the risk of stroke from AF. Anticoagulation medication is recommended in most people with increased risk of stroke, which can be estimated using the CHA_{2}DS_{2}-VASc score.

The risk of falls and consequent bleeding in frail elderly people should not be considered a barrier to initiating or continuing anticoagulation since the risk of fall-related brain bleeding is low and the benefit of stroke prevention often outweighs the risk of bleeding. The presence or absence of AF symptoms does not determine whether a person warrants anticoagulation and is not an indicator of stroke risk.

Direct oral anticoagulant (DOAC) are recommended over warfarin in atrial fibrillation. In atrial fibrillation with presence of moderate to severe mitral stenosis or mechanical heart valve, warfarin is recommended over other therapies. DOACs carry a lower risk of bleeding in the brain compared to warfarin, although dabigatran is associated with a higher risk of intestinal bleeding.

Direct oral anticoagulant (DOAC), previously called "new", "novel", or "non-vitamin K antagonist" oral anticoagulant (NOAC), are medications taken orally that have another mechanism of action on the coagulation cascade than warfarin. DOACs recommended in atrial fibrillation include apixaban, dabigatran, edoxaban and rivaroxaban.

Antiplatelet drugs alone, such as aspirin or dual antiplatelet therapy with aspirin and clopidogrel, is not recommended as stroke prophylaxis in atrial fibrillation. In those who are also on aspirin, DOACs appear to be better than warfarin.

The optimal approach to anticoagulation in people with AF and who simultaneously have other diseases (e.g., cirrhosis and end-stage kidney disease on dialysis) that predispose a person to both bleeding and clotting complications is unclear.

For vitamin K antagonists (VKA) such as warfarin, time in therapeutic range (TTR) and INR variability are commonly used to assess the quality of VKA treatment. Patients who are unable to maintain a therapeutic INR on VKA, as indicated by low TTR and/or high INR variability, are at an increased risk of thromboembolic and bleeding events. In these patients, treatment with a DOAC is recommended. While there are no significant changes in adherence, persistence or clinical outcomes in patients switched from a VKA to a DOAC, an increase in therapy satisfaction has been reported.

=== Rate versus rhythm control ===
There are two ways to approach atrial fibrillation using medications: rate control and rhythm control. Both methods have similar outcomes. Rate control lowers the heart rate closer to normal, usually 60 to 100 bpm, without trying to convert to a regular rhythm. Rhythm control tries to restore a normal heart rhythm in a process called cardioversion and maintains the normal rhythm with medications. Studies suggest that rhythm control is more important in the acute setting AF, whereas rate control is more important in the long-term.

The risk of stroke appears to be lower with rate control versus attempted rhythm control, at least in those with heart failure. AF is associated with a reduced quality of life, and, while some studies indicate that rhythm control leads to a higher quality of life, some did not find a difference. Neither rate nor rhythm control is superior in people with heart failure when they are compared in various clinical trials. However, rate control is recommended as the first-line treatment regimen for people with heart failure. On the other hand, rhythm control is only recommended when people experience persistent symptoms despite adequate rate control therapy.

In those with a fast ventricular response, intravenous magnesium significantly increases the chances of achieving successful rate and rhythm control in the urgent setting without major side-effects. A person with poor vital signs, mental status changes, preexcitation, or chest pain often will go to immediate treatment with synchronized direct current cardioversion. Otherwise, the decision of rate control versus rhythm control using medications is made. This is based on several criteria that include whether or not symptoms persist with rate control.

=== Rate control ===
Rate control to a target heart rate of fewer than 110 beats per minute is recommended in most people. Lower heart rates may be recommended in those with left ventricular hypertrophy or reduced left ventricular function. Rate control is achieved with medications that work by increasing the degree of the block at the level of the AV node, decreasing the number of impulses that conduct into the ventricles. This can be done with:

- Beta blockers (preferably the "cardioselective" beta blockers such as metoprolol, bisoprolol, or nebivolol)
- Non-dihydropyridine calcium channel blockers (e.g., diltiazem or verapamil)
- Cardiac glycosides (e.g., digoxin) – have less use, apart from in older people who are sedentary. They are not as effective as either beta-blockers or calcium channel blockers.

In addition to these agents, amiodarone has some AV node blocking effects (in particular when administered intravenously) and can be used in individuals when other agents are contraindicated or ineffective (particularly due to hypotension).

=== Cardioversion ===
Cardioversion is the attempt to switch an irregular heartbeat to a normal heartbeat using electrical or chemical means.

- Electrical cardioversion involves the restoration of normal heart rhythm through the application of a direct current electrical shock. The exact placement of the pads does not appear to be important.
- Chemical cardioversion is performed with medications, such as amiodarone, dronedarone, procainamide (especially in pre-excited atrial fibrillation), dofetilide, ibutilide, propafenone, or flecainide.

After successful cardioversion, the heart may be stunned, which means that there is a normal rhythm, but the restoration of normal atrial contraction has not yet occurred.

=== Surgery ===
==== Ablation ====
Catheter ablation (CA) is a procedure performed by an electrophysiologist, a cardiologist who specializes in heart rhythm problems, to restore the heart's normal rhythm by destroying, or electrically isolating, specific parts of the atria. A group of cardiologists led by Dr Haïssaguerre from Bordeaux University Hospital noted in 1998 that the pulmonary veins are an important source of ectopic beats, initiating frequent paroxysms of atrial fibrillation, with these foci responding to treatment with radio-frequency ablation. Most commonly, CA electrically isolates the left atrium from the pulmonary veins, where most of the abnormal electrical activity promoting atrial fibrillation originates. CA is a form of rhythm control that restores normal sinus rhythm and reduces AF-associated symptoms more reliably than antiarrhythmic medications.

Electrophysiologists generally use three forms of catheter ablation: radiofrequency (RF) ablation, cryoablation ("cryo"), or pulsed field (PF). In young people with little-to-no structural heart disease where rhythm control is desired and cannot be maintained by medication or cardioversion, ablation may be attempted and may be preferred over several years of medical therapy. Although radiofrequency ablation has become an accepted intervention in selected younger people and may be more effective than medication at improving symptoms and quality of life, there is no evidence that ablation reduces all-cause mortality, stroke, or heart failure. Some evidence indicates CA may be particularly helpful for people with AF who also have heart failure. AF may recur in people who have undergone CA and nearly half of people who undergo it will require a repeat procedure to achieve long-term control of their AF.

In general, CA is more successful at preventing AF recurrence if AF is paroxysmal as opposed to persistent. As CA does not reduce the risk of stroke, many are advised to continue their anticoagulation. Possible complications include common, minor complications such as the formation of a collection of blood at the site where the catheter goes into the vein (access site hematoma), but also more dangerous complications including bleeding around the heart (cardiac tamponade), stroke, damage to the esophagus (atrio-esophageal fistula), or even death. Use of pulsed field ablation as a non-thermal method of inducing electroporation avoids damage to the phrenic nerve, esophagus, and blood vessels, while being at least as effective as thermal ablation methods.

A hybrid convergent procedure has been developed which combines endocardial ablation with epicardial ablation, which can reduce AF recurrence to less than 5% for over one year. The epicardial ablation is performed first, with a minimally invasive surgical approach.

In addition to procedures targeting the pulmonary veins, ablation can be utilized in an "ablate-and-pace" strategy for patients with coexisting refractory atrial fibrillation and heart failure. This procedure involves the ablation of the AV junction to block irregular electrical impulses from reaching the ventricles, combined with the implantation of a permanent pacemaker (often involving cardiac resynchronization therapy (CRT) via biventricular pacing or conduction system pacing (CSP)) to maintain a stable heart rate. This approach is utilized when pharmacological rate control is ineffective or maintaining a durable sinus rhythm is unlikely, especially in individuals of advanced age or with significant comorbidities. The ablation itself may be performed either simultaneously with the device implantation or as a subsequent procedure.

==== Maze procedure ====
An alternative to catheter ablation is surgical ablation. The maze procedure, first performed in 1987, is an effective invasive surgical treatment that is designed to create electrical blocks or barriers in the atria of the heart. The idea is to force abnormal electrical signals to move along one, uniform path to the lower chambers of the heart (ventricles), thus restoring the normal heart rhythm. People with AF often undergo cardiac surgery for other underlying reasons and are frequently offered concomitant AF surgery to reduce the frequency of short- and long-term AF. Concomitant AF surgery is more likely to lead to the person being free from atrial fibrillation and off medications long-term after surgery and Cox-Maze IV procedure is the gold standard treatment. There is a slightly increased risk of needing a pacemaker following the procedure. Less invasive modifications of the maze procedure have been developed, designated as minimaze procedures.

==== Left atrial appendage occlusion ====
There is growing evidence that left atrial appendage occlusion therapy may reduce the risk of stroke in people with non-valvular AF as much as warfarin. The addition of left atrial appendage isolation to catheter ablation has reduced AF recurrence by 80% in patients with persistent AF.

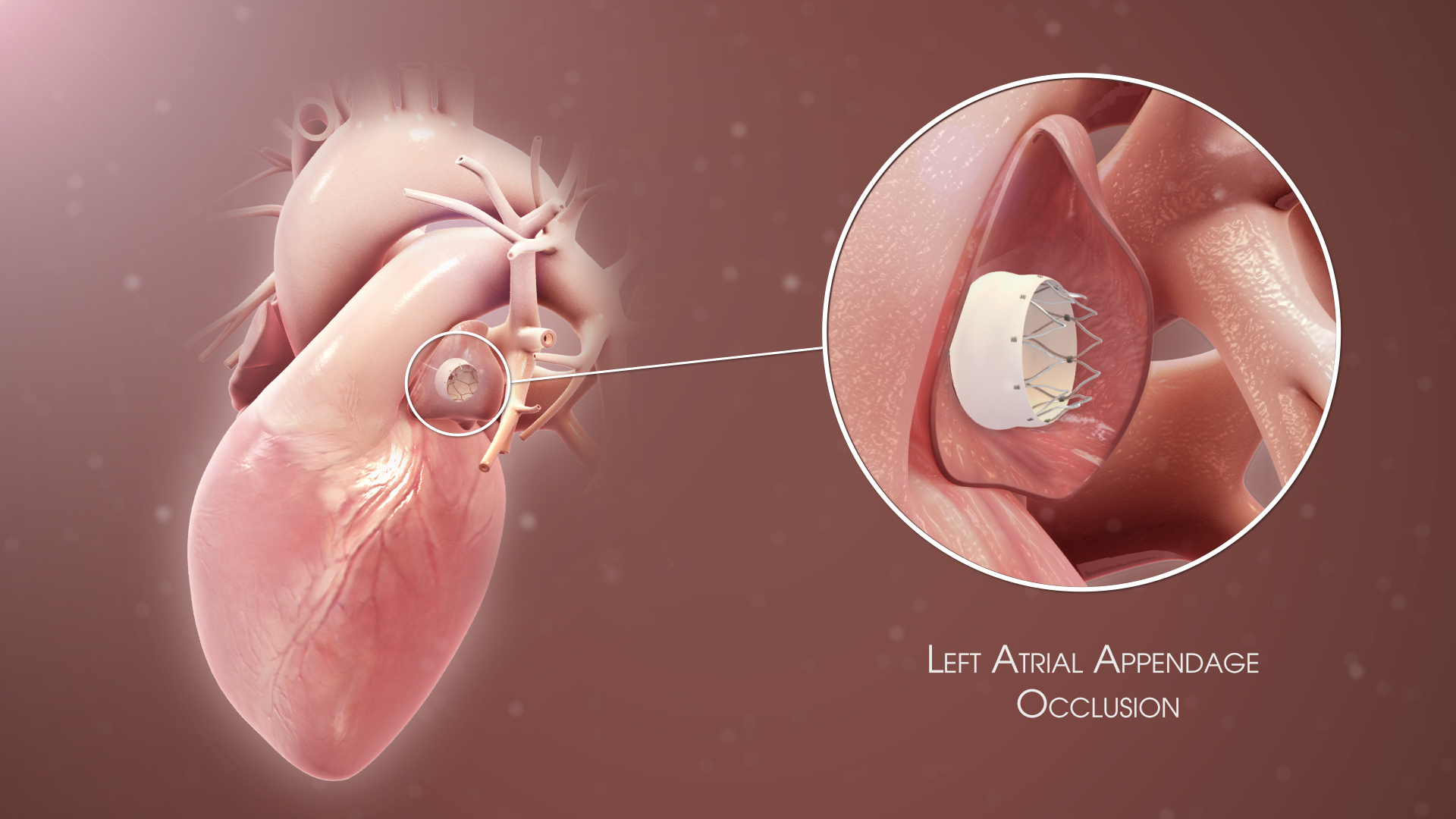
3D medical animation still shot of left atrial appendage occlusion

==== After surgery ====
After catheter ablation, people are moved to a cardiac recovery unit, intensive care unit, or cardiovascular intensive care unit where they are not allowed to move for 4–6 hours. Minimizing movement helps prevent bleeding from the site of the catheter insertion. The length of time people stay in the hospital varies from hours to days. This depends on the problem, the length of the operation, and whether or not general anesthetic was used. Additionally, people should not engage in strenuous physical activity – to maintain a low heart rate and low blood pressure – for around six weeks.

AF often occurs after cardiac surgery and is usually self-limiting. It is strongly associated with age, preoperative hypertension, and the number of vessels grafted. Measures should be taken to control hypertension preoperatively to reduce the risk of AF. Also, people with a higher risk of AF, e.g., people with pre-operative hypertension, more than three vessels grafted, or greater than 70 years of age, should be considered for prophylactic treatment. Postoperative pericardial effusion is also suspected to be the cause of atrial fibrillation. Prophylaxis may include prophylactic postoperative rate and rhythm management. Some authors perform posterior pericardiotomy to reduce the incidence of postoperative AF. When AF occurs, management should primarily be rate and rhythm control. However, cardioversion may be used if the patient is hemodynamically unstable, highly symptomatic, or AF persists for six weeks after discharge. In persistent cases, anticoagulation should be used.

== Prognosis ==
Atrial fibrillation can progress from infrequent occurrences to more frequent occurrences, ultimately becoming permanent. Some cases do not progress, especially among patients with a healthy lifestyle.

Many mechanisms contribute to cardiac remodeling leading to a worsening of atrial fibrillation, including fibrosis, fatty infiltration, amyloidosis, and ion channel modifications. Fatty infiltration helps explain why obesity is a risk factor for atrial fibrillation in one fifth of patients.

Atrial fibrillation increases the risk of heart failure by 11 per 1000, kidney problems by 6 per 1000, death by 4 per 1000, stroke by 3 per 1000, and coronary heart disease by 1 per 1000. Women have a worse outcome overall than men. Evidence increasingly suggests that atrial fibrillation is independently associated with a higher risk of developing dementia.

=== Blood clots ===
==== Prediction of embolism ====
Determining the risk of an embolism causing a stroke is important for guiding the use of anticoagulants. The most accurate clinical prediction rules is the CHA_{2}DS_{2}-VASc score. The addition of blood based biomarkers such as NT-proBNP and neurofilament light chain improves risk prediction significantly. A CHA_{2}DS_{2}-VASc score of zero is considered very low risk.

==== Mechanism of thrombus formation ====
In atrial fibrillation, the lack of an organized atrial contraction can result in some stagnant blood in the left atrium (LA) or left atrial appendage (LAA). This lack of movement of blood can lead to thrombus formation (blood clotting). If the clot becomes mobile and is carried away by the blood circulation, it is called an embolus. An embolus proceeds through smaller and smaller arteries until it plugs one of them and prevents blood from flowing through the artery. This process results in end organ damage due to the loss of nutrients, oxygen, and the removal of cellular waste products. Emboli in the brain may result in an ischemic stroke or a transient ischemic attack (TIA).

More than 90% of cases of thrombi associated with non-valvular atrial fibrillation evolve in the left atrial appendage. However, the LAA lies in close relation to the free wall of the left ventricle, and thus the LAA's emptying and filling, which determines its degree of blood stagnation, may be helped by the motion of the wall of the left ventricle if there is good ventricular function.

=== Dementia ===
Atrial fibrillation has been independently associated with a higher risk of developing cognitive impairment, vascular dementia, and Alzheimer disease and with elevated levels of neurofilament light chain in blood, a biomarker indicating neuroaxonal injury. Several mechanisms for this association have been proposed, including silent small blood clots (subclinical microthrombi) traveling to the brain resulting in small ischemic strokes without symptoms, altered blood flow to the brain, inflammation, clinically silent small bleeds in the brain, and genetic factors. Tentative evidence suggests that effective anticoagulation with direct oral anticoagulants or warfarin may be somewhat protective against AF-associated dementia and evidence of silent ischemic strokes on MRI but this remains an active area of investigation.

== Epidemiology ==
Atrial fibrillation is the most common arrhythmia and affects more than 33 million people worldwide. In Europe and North America, as of 2014, it affects about 2% to 3% of the population. In the developing world, rates are about 0.6% for males and 0.4% for females. The number of people diagnosed with AF has increased due to better detection of silent AF, increasing age and increase of conditions that predispose to it such as obesity and increasing survival from other forms of cardiovascular disease.

New diagnoses of atrial fibrillation have increased by about 30% in the two decades between 2000 and 2020, and atrial fibrillation is now one of the most common cardiovascular disease presentations. Recent European cohorts have reported atrial fibrillation incidence to be between 322 and 478 per 100 000 patient-years, and, with that, to be more common than myocardial infarction, stroke, or heart failure, which have incidence rates of 190, 181, and 367 per 100 000 patient-years respectively.

The rate of hospital admissions for AF has risen. AF is the cause for 20% of all ischemic strokes. After a transient ischemic attack or stroke, about 11% are found to have a new diagnosis of atrial fibrillation. 3% to 11% of patients with AF have structurally normal hearts.

The number of new cases each year of AF increases with age. In younger people the prevalence is estimated to be 0.05% and is associated with congenital heart disease or structural heart disease in this demographic. As of 2001, it was anticipated that in developed countries, the number of people with atrial fibrillation was likely to increase during the following 50 years, due to the growing proportion of elderly people.

=== Gender ===
Atrial fibrillation is about 50% more common in men than in women when reviewed in European and North American populations. In developed and developing countries, there is also a higher rate in men than in women. The risk factors associated with AF are also distributed differently according to gender. In men, coronary disease is more frequent, while in women, high systolic blood pressure and valvular heart disease are more prevalent.

=== Ethnicity ===
Rates of AF are lower in populations of African descent than in populations of European descent. African descent is associated with a protective effect for AF, due to the lower presence of SNPs with guanine alleles. European ancestry has more frequent mutations. The variant rs4611994 for the gene PITX2 is associated with risk of AF in African and European populations. Hispanic and Asian populations have a lower risk of AF than European populations. The risk of AF in non-European populations is associated with characteristic risk factors of these populations, such as hypertension.

=== Young people ===
Median age at diagnosis of atrial fibrillation is 75 years in men and 80 years in women. Atrial fibrillation is an uncommon condition in children but sometimes occurs in association with certain inherited and acquired conditions. Congenital heart disease and rheumatic fever are the most common causes of atrial fibrillation in children. Other inherited heart conditions associated with the development of atrial fibrillation in children include Brugada syndrome, short QT syndrome, Wolff Parkinson White syndrome, and other forms of supraventricular tachycardia (e.g., AV nodal reentrant tachycardia). Adults who survived congenital heart disease have an increased risk of developing AF. In particular, people who had atrial septal defects, Tetralogy of Fallot, or Ebstein's anomaly, and those who underwent the Fontan procedure, are at higher risk with prevalence rates of up to 30% depending on the heart's anatomy and the person's age.

==== Australia ====
In Australia, atrial fibrillation affects approximately 2.4% of the adult population, with an estimated 500,000 Australians living with the condition. Aboriginal and Torres Strait Islander Australians experience atrial fibrillation at younger ages than non-Indigenous Australians, driven largely by rheumatic heart disease related valvular disease, particularly mitral stenosis resulting from repeated episodes of acute rheumatic fever in childhood and adolescence. Studies indicate that Indigenous Australians have higher rates of hospitalisation for atrial fibrillation than non-Indigenous Australians, occurring with greater comorbidity burden and at earlier ages. In rural and remote Australia, where specialist cardiology services and cardioversion facilities are limited, management of atrial fibrillation frequently requires rural medical officers to initiate rate control and anticoagulation prior to transfer to regional referral centres. The National Heart Foundation of Australia and the Cardiac Society of Australia and New Zealand recommend opportunistic screening for atrial fibrillation in adults aged 65 years and older, with emerging evidence supporting earlier screening in Indigenous Australians given the younger age of disease onset in this population.

== History ==
Because the diagnosis of atrial fibrillation requires measurement of the electrical activity of the heart, atrial fibrillation was not truly described until 1874, when Edmé Félix Alfred Vulpian observed the irregular atrial electrical behavior that he termed "fremissement fibrillaire" in dog hearts. In the mid-18th century, Jean-Baptiste de Sénac made note of dilated, irritated atria in people with mitral stenosis. The irregular pulse associated with AF was first recorded in 1876 by Carl Wilhelm Hermann Nothnagel and termed "delirium cordis", stating that "[I]n this form of arrhythmia the heartbeats follow each other in complete irregularity. At the same time, the height and tension of the individual pulse waves are continuously changing". Correlation of delirium cordis with the loss of atrial contraction, as reflected in the loss of a waves in the jugular venous pulse, was made by Sir James MacKenzie in 1904. Willem Einthoven published the first ECG showing AF in 1906. The connection between the anatomic and electrical manifestations of AF and the irregular pulse of delirium cordis was made in 1909 by Carl Julius Rothberger, Heinrich Winterberg, and Sir Thomas Lewis.

== Other animals ==
Atrial fibrillation occurs in other animals, including cats, dogs, and horses. Unlike humans, dogs rarely develop the complications that stem from blood clots breaking off from inside the heart and traveling through the arteries to distant sites (thromboembolic complications). Cats rarely develop atrial fibrillation but appear to have a higher risk of thromboembolic complications than dogs.

Cats and dogs with atrial fibrillation often have underlying structural heart disease that predisposes them to the condition. The medications used in animals for atrial fibrillation are largely similar to those used in humans. Electrical cardioversion is occasionally performed in these animals, but the need for general anesthesia limits its use. Standardbred horses appear to be genetically susceptible to developing atrial fibrillation. Horses that develop atrial fibrillation often have minimal or no underlying heart disease, and the presence of atrial fibrillation in horses can adversely affect physical performance.
