= Emergency ultrasound =

Medical imaging technology

Emergency ultrasound, employing point-of-care ultrasound, is the application of ultrasound at the point of care to make immediate patient-care decisions. It is performed by the health care professional caring for the injured or ill persons. This point-of-care use of ultrasound is often to evaluate an emergency medical condition, in settings such as an emergency department, critical care unit, ambulance, or combat zone.

== Setting ==
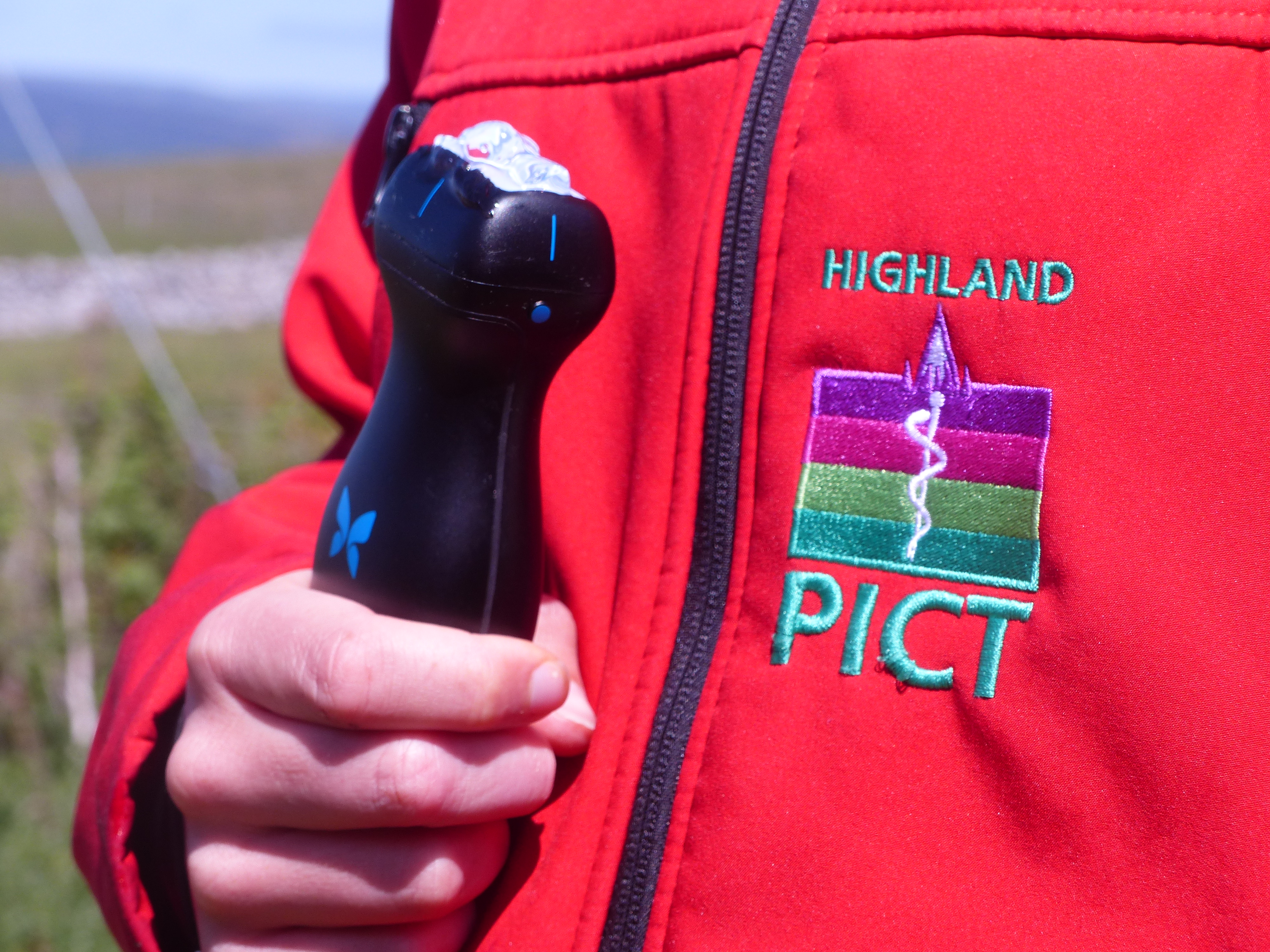
A portable ultrasound machine used in the prehospital setting

Emergency ultrasound is used to quickly diagnose a limited set of injuries or pathologic conditions, specifically those where conventional diagnostic methods would either take too long or would introduce greater risk to a person (either by transporting the person away from the most closely monitored setting, or exposing them to ionizing radiation and/or intravenous contrast agents).

Point of care ultrasound has been used in a wide variety of specialties and has increased in use in the last decade as ultrasound machines have become more compact and portable. It is now used for a variety of exams in various clinical settings at the person's bedside. In the emergency setting, it is used to guide resuscitation and monitor critically ill persons, provide procedural guidance for improved safety and confirm clinical diagnosis.

In contrast to a comprehensive ultrasound examination, which is typically performed by a sonographer and interpreted by a specialist, point-of-care ultrasound examinations are performed and interpreted by the same clinician and are typically narrower in scope.

== Scope ==
=== Resuscitation of the critically ill ===
Point of care ultrasound is sometimes the only option in the evaluation of injured persons who are too ill for transport to other imaging modalities (i.e. computed tomography, or CT scan) or whose illness is so acute that medical decisions in their care need to be made in seconds to minutes. It is also increasingly used to guide and triage care in resource-limited situations, in rural or medically under-served areas.

For people who present signs of traumatic injury, the focused assessment with sonography for trauma or FAST exam is used to assess hypotensive persons for occult bleeding. Traditionally used by emergency physicians and surgeons treating trauma persons, it has also been used by paramedics in combat zones, and for non-traumatic problems such as ruptured ectopic pregnancy. Similarly, emergency ultrasound can also evaluate the lungs for hemothorax (bleeding in the chest), and pneumothorax (a puncture resulting in air trapped in the chest and lung collapse).

People presenting with hypotension of unknown cause, ultrasound has been utilized to determine the cause of shock. Evaluation of the heart and inferior vena cava (IVC) can help the clinician at the bedside choose important treatments and monitor the response to the interventions.

A person who has hypotension and a bedside ultrasound showing hyperdynamic left heart with a flat, collapsible IVC indicates low blood volume. If the person also has a fever, the clinician may determine sepsis, or severe infection is causing the problem. If that same hypotensive person has back pain instead of a fever, the clinician may see an abdominal aortic aneurysm that is leaking or ruptured. Conversely, weak heart activity and a very full, non-collapsible IVC would indicate a cardiac cause for low blood pressure.

For those presenting with acute shortness of breath, ultrasound assessment of the lung, heart, and IVC can evaluate for potentially life-threatening diseases, including pneumothorax, significant pleural effusions, congestive heart failure, pulmonary edema, pericardial effusion, and some large pulmonary emboli (one standardized method is called the BLUE protocol).

With its increased availability, ultrasound is now frequently used more in code situations, in which a person has lost most or all signs of life. Practitioners may use the ultrasound to see if the heart is moving, beating in organized fashion or if it has a pericardial effusion or fluid around it. Pericardiocentesis, a procedure in which a needle is used to drain the effusion, can utilize ultrasound guidance of a needle to decrease the risk of hitting lungs, heart or other vital organs

=== Monitoring therapy ===
Emergency ultrasound can not only diagnose, but also monitor a person's response to therapeutic interventions. Ultrasound can be utilized to assess a person's intravascular volume status and response to intravenous fluid therapy by measuring the size and respiratory change in the diameter of the IVC, including the assessment of central venous collapsibility as a more standardized measure of intravascular volume status. More recent evidence suggests that ultrasound assessment of more "peripheral" veins (e.g., subclavian, femoral, internal jugular) may also be helpful in estimating intravascular volume status in the absence of IVC visualization. Ultrasound of the lungs may demonstrate resolution of pulmonary edema from congestive heart failure.

=== Procedural guidance ===
Using ultrasound to guide needles during procedures may improve success and decrease complications in procedures performed by multiple specialties, including central and venous access, arterial cannulation, thoracentesis, paracentesis, pericardiocentesis, arthrocentesis, regional anesthesia, incision and drainage of abscesses, localization and removal of foreign bodies, lumbar puncture, biopsies, and other procedures.

=== Diagnostic ===
Point-of-care ultrasound is being increasingly used to speed patient care and to avoid ionizing radiation (for example, pediatric or pregnant patients). Quick diagnosis is still valuable for both an injured and healthcare professional. The efficiency of obtaining the answer to a focused question within minutes is one of the driving forces of the popularity of bedside ultrasound. Use of this modality in settings such as the emergency department can decrease waiting times and improve satisfaction among those served.

Cardiac: Chest pain is one of the most common complaints presenting to the emergency department. Those presenting with chest pain, focused cardiac ultrasound can be helpful in the evaluation of persons with potentially life-threatening disease such as a pericardial effusion, a severe pulmonary embolus (or blood clot in the lungs), or in screening those with suspected aortic dissection. The use of ultrasound is also helpful in persons with chest pain due to suspected heart ischemia, especially when the baseline electrocardiogram or EKG, is non-diagnostic.Point-of-care compression ultrasonography of the proximal lower extremity is a validated method for diagnosing deep vein thrombosis (DVT). The clinician compresses the femoral and popliteal veins under ultrasound visualization, with failure of vein collapse indicating thrombus. This method is quick, non-invasive, and useful in both emergency and inpatient settings.

Emergency ultrasound also effectively aids abdominal aortic aneurysm (AAA) screening and rupture evaluation. Rapid assessment for an enlarged or ruptured aneurysm using a transverse and longitudinal scan of the abdominal aorta has high sensitivity and specificity, making it a first-line tool in hypotensive patients with abdominal or back pain.

The more technically demanding aspects of echocardiographic interpretation, and should be reserved for more formal comprehensive echocardiography.

Abdominal complaints: Abdominal pain is also a common complaint in the primary care and emergency department setting. Gallbladder disease is a frequent cause of abdominal pain, but can also result in critical illness. Bedside ultrasound assesses the gallbladder for presence of gallstones that cause the majority of gallbladder illness. Emergency ultrasound of the gallbladder can help speed diagnosis and care.

Flank pain can indicate obstructing kidney stones or abdominal aortic aneurysm. If obstructing kidney stones are suspected, the kidneys can be evaluated by ultrasound for signs of obstruction, called hydronephrosis. A common use of ultrasound is identifying or evaluating the fetus in a person who is pregnant. Women in the first trimester of pregnancy can have a tubal or ectopic pregnancy outside the uterus that is life-threatening if not identified. A more advanced fetus may be evaluated for normal heart rate and movement and gestational age to help guide care of both the fetus and the pregnant mother.

Other symptom-oriented diagnostic exams: Blood clots that form in deep veins of the body can break off and block blood vessels in the lungs, resulting in low oxygen, heart strain and death. The most common location of these deep vein thromboses (DVTs) is in the legs. A bedside ultrasound can determine the presence or absence of blood clots and their location in the proximal lower extremity to behind the knee. Those presenting with eye pain or visual loss, ultrasound of the eye can be used for the detection of orbital pathology. Ultrasound has been described to detect retinal detachments, vitreous hemorrhage, dislocation of the lens, as well as evaluating optic nerve sheath diameters as a potential indicator of other diseases in the central nervous system.

Now that ultrasound is available in portable units that are smaller than laptop computers and handheld models, it is being used more and more in many clinical settings. Many practitioners use point-of-care ultrasound in diagnosing other urgent and emergency problems, including appendicitis, testicular torsion, and abscesses. To describe each of these fully is beyond the scope of this entry, and impossible as the use of ultrasound is expanding rapidly:

- Testicular Pain – Evaluation for testicular torsion, orchitis, epididymitis, hernia
- Pelvic Pain – Evaluation for ovarian torsion, ovarian cyst, and ovarian cyst rupture
- IVC – Evaluation of volume status and estimation of fluid responsiveness
- The RUSH exam for Shock or Hypotension
- Bones - Evaluation for fractures

== Training ==
Emergency and point-of-care ultrasound is taught in a variety of settings. Many physicians are currently taught bedside ultrasound during the emergency medicine residency or critical care fellowship training programs in the United States. It can also be learned as part of the continuing education process, through formal didactics, one-on-one training, training software, and clinical application and practice. Other specialists may learn during their residency or fellowship training programs. There are specialized fellowship training programs for bedside ultrasound in emergency medicine, but these are not required nor expected for the use of this tool in practice. Training has been expanded to other specialties in medical and surgical fields and is expected to expand in the future.

== See also ==
- Duplex ultrasonography
- Pre-hospital ultrasound
