= EchoNous =

American medical technology company

- Type: Private
- Industry: Medical technology Medical devices
- Founded: 2016; 10 years ago in Redmond, Washington, United States
- Founders: Kevin Goodwin; Niko Pagoulatos
- Headquarters: Redmond, Washington, United States
- Products: Point-of-care ultrasound devices
- Services: AI-assisted ultrasound software POCUS imaging systems
- Website: echonous.com

EchoNous is an American medical technology company that develops point-of-care ultrasound (POCUS) devices and AI-assisted imaging software for bedside clinical use. The company is based in Redmond, Washington.

== History ==
EchoNous was founded in 2016 in Redmond by Kevin Goodwin and Niko Pagoulatos.

In 2017, EchoNous received a $35 million investment from KKR to expand its Uscan bladder scanner business and develop a new AI-driven ultrasound platform.

In March 2020, the U.S. Food and Drug Administration (FDA) cleared Kosmos through the 510(k) process. In 2021, EchoNous raised $60 million from Kennedy Lewis Investment Management to support the commercial launch of Kosmos. Later that year, the FDA cleared the company's Lexsa linear probe for use with the Kosmos platform.

In 2022, EchoNous raised $57 million in a Series D round. That year, the company also partnered with Samsung so that Kosmos could run on Galaxy Tab Active Pro tablets instead of only on EchoNous's display.

In 2023, EchoNous raised an additional $7 million. The FDA issued additional 510(k) clearances for Kosmos in 2024 and 2025.

== Kosmos ==
Kosmos is a hand-carried ultrasound system that combines ultrasound imaging with AI-based guidance, image labeling, and automated cardiac measurements. FDA-cleared indications for the platform include cardiac, thoracic/lung, abdominal, peripheral vascular, and image-guidance applications. The platform was later expanded with the Lexsa linear probe, and it is compatible with select Apple iOS and Android tablets.
