= 2017 Puerto Rico leptospirosis outbreak =

- Date: September–November 2017
- Location: Puerto Rico

The 2017 Puerto Rico leptospirosis outbreak was an outbreak of leptospirosis that affected Puerto Rico in the fall of 2017, following Hurricane Maria's landfall.

== Background ==
Leptospirosis, caused by an infection of Leptospira bacteria, is most commonly transmitted via contaminated water supplies, with over 870,000 cases and 49,000 deaths reported annually. Caribbean islands, such as Puerto Rico, have among the highest incidence rates of the disease, with climate, geographic, and socioeconomic factors interacting to increase population risk.

Infection develops following exposure to water or soil containing the bacteria, which is often found in the urine or feces of infected animals—most commonly livestock, rodents or pets. The global prevalence of leptospirosis is projected to rise in line with demographic shifts that increase the number of poor, urban residents in tropical regions affected by climate change.

Cases of infectious diseases, including leptospirosis, often spike in the aftermath of intense storms, due to flooding and damage of infrastructure. Diseases transmitted from animals to humans are collectively known as zoonotic diseases. Urban expansion into undeveloped areas has increased human contact with rodent habitats, creating additional pathways for leptospirosis transmission, especially during heavy rainfall or other inclement weather.

The delayed onset of symptoms of leptospirosis can make it difficult to detect. After an incubation period of typically 5 to 10 days, but potentially as early as 2 days and up to 30 days after infection, people infected with Leptospira bacteria can develop flu-like symptoms including fever, chills, headache, myalgia (muscle pain), cough, vomiting, and diarrhea. The early signs of the disease are vague and often too general for a confident diagnosis of leptospirosis. In some cases, patients may present with only mild illness with other differentials considered, including meningitis, influenza, sepsis, and many others. Other patients will present with the fulminant infection, exhibiting signs of end stage liver failure, acute renal failure, or severe pulmonary hemorrhage syndrome (SPHS).

The test considered to be the gold standard for leptospirosis diagnosis by the World Health Organization (WHO) is not very sensitive in the early stages of the disease, before the body has had a chance to mount an immune response. This test, the microagglutination test (MAT), is a serologic test that measures the level of antibodies created by the immune system in response to the leptospira bacteria. Although this test has high specificity, it has low sensitivity, limiting its ability to identify infected individuals. Doctors will typically submit paired serum samples from both early and later in the course of illness in order to demonstrate a four-fold rise in titer, an indication of a positive result. Additionally, individuals living in a leptospira-endemic region may have a relatively high initial MAT test that only indicates previous infection, not necessarily disease. Commonly, clinicians will submit blood and urine for polymerase chain reaction (PCR) testing, though it is often time-sensitive as samples should be collected before antibiotic treatment and there is typically a 1-to-5-day delay in results, depending on the lab used. In regions with limited laboratory capacity, clinicians often rely on clinical judgment and epidemiologic context, which can delay targeted treatment during outbreaks.

== Outbreak ==
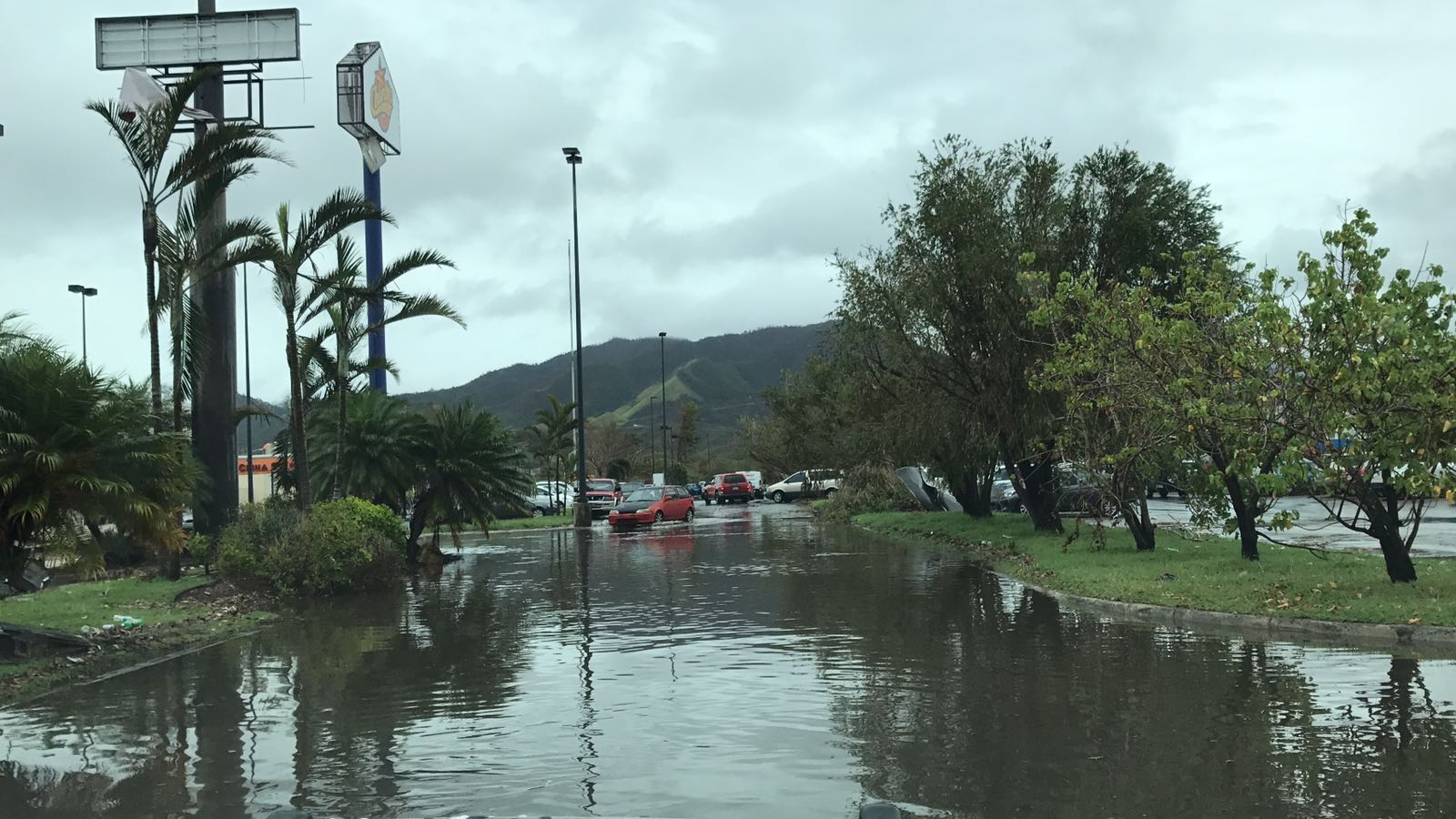
Standing water in Ponce, Puerto Rico, more than a week after Hurricane Maria hit the island

Following the hurricane, large areas of Puerto Rico were without tap water, forcing residents to use other sources of water, such as streams. Since leptospirosis is contracted through water contaminated with animal urine, it is possible this is how people contracted the disease. By October 23, four people were suspected to have died from the disease, while 74 others were suspected to be infected. There were 18 confirmed cases, 4 confirmed deaths, and 99 suspected cases by November 7. This was a rapid increase from Puerto Rico's typical average of 5 cases of leptospirosis per month. Despite the possibility there had been an outbreak, officials did not deem the situation dire. Researchers in public health found that the hurricane response used inconsistent reporting systems, making it harder to detect new cases.

In July 2018, CNN, in collaboration with the Center for Investigative Journalism (CPI), published an online article in which seven disease experts reviewed an official Puerto Rico government mortality database. The data reviewed included 57 laboratory-confirmed cases of leptospirosis in 2017. Of those, 54 of them were reported after Hurricane Maria made landfall on 20 September 2017. The number of laboratory-confirmed cases amounted to at least a three-fold increase in cases compared to 2016 and 2015. The experts all agreed that, since the records listed such a large number of confirmed cases of leptospirosis, Puerto Rico officials should have declared an epidemic or an outbreak after Hurricane Maria.

== Responses ==
Many of Puerto Rico's essential public health, health care, and other government services were rendered inoperative in the immediate aftermath of Hurricane Maria. Two weeks after the storm, only 5% of electrical power had been restored to the island, 11% of cell phone towers had been fixed, approximately 50% of the supermarkets were open, 9 of 69 hospitals had been connected back to the electric grid, and less than 50% of water services had been re-established. The slow pace of recovery from the storm itself fueled public anger toward the Puerto Rican and U.S. governments for failing to prioritize the island's urgent needs.

As reports of a spike in leptospirosis cases and deaths in Puerto Rico spread, the government came under heavy criticism for its response, or lack thereof, to news of a potential outbreak. Territorial officials were blamed for the perceived failure to properly equip disaster response workers who had to operate in flood waters, delays in laboratory testing to confirm leptospirosis cases (both among patients undergoing treatment and deceased individuals), and an unwillingness to report morbidity and mortality data related to leptospirosis once there was increased public scrutiny in response to the rise in deaths. According to emergency responders, communication outages increased the difficulty of coordinating specimen transport and receiving laboratory updates.

Despite criticism by the public, the Puerto Rico Department of Public Health (PRDOH) denies the claim of a poor response. PRDOH, with their main lab in San Juan, typically provides lab testing and surveillance of disease in the areas affected by Hurricane Maria. There are ancillary facilities located in Arecibo, Ponce, and Mayaguez. PRDOH requested assistance from the Centers for Disease Control and Prevention (CDC), the CDC Foundation, and the Association of Public Health Laboratories (APHL) during the aftermath. It is reported that there was severe damage to the laboratory facilities, specifically three essential lab sectors, including the electrical power supply for the facility, physical structure of the laboratory, and damage to the equipment and chemical reagents from power loss and water leaks. The lab was able to create a temporary solution to transport samples from Puerto Rico in the direct aftermath of Hurricane Maria to the U.S. for surveillance and diagnostic testing, thereby allowing the continual surveillance and diagnosis of high priority diseases during the rebuilding of the PRDOH facility and the restoration of essential laboratory services.

The CDC reported several challenges associated with this temporary system, including the inconsistent shipping availability to the United States, reliance on a single generator to power the remaining PRDOH laboratory and communications (fax), and availability of appropriate specimen containers. Despite the challenges, the CDC reported successful transport and shipping of over 1,700 samples in 4 months and the identification of close to 350 cases referred to as 'high-priority infectious disease,' including leptospirosis.

=== Public Health Messaging ===
In its October 2017 hurricane guidance, the Centers for Disease Control and Prevention (CDC) identified limited access to safe water in Puerto Rico as a risk factor for leptospirosis, because residents might use untreated water for drinking or bathing. Its prevention messages recommended avoiding potentially contaminated water, treating drinking water, covering cuts with waterproof dressings, and wearing waterproof clothing and footwear when exposure could not be avoided.

The CDC’s hurricane response also included public communication through radio announcements, social media, and printed materials in English and Spanish, with other languages available on request. In Puerto Rico, responders received information about protective clothing, boots, and hygiene to reduce exposure to contaminated water.

== Public health implications ==
=== Outbreak monitoring and surveillance ===
Like most densely inhabited tropical islands, Puerto Rico has high concentrations of risk factors for zoonotic diseases such as leptospirosis. Throughout the Caribbean, widespread poverty, a hot and steadily warming climate, invasive species, tourism, and lack of adequate infrastructure contribute to the persistence of endemic tropical diseases. Syndromic surveillance tools for tracking clusters of febrile or respiratory illnesses have been recommended as low-resource methods for flagging potential early outbreaks.

Leptospirosis outbreaks have occurred in Puerto Rico in previous years. In 1996, Hurricane Hortense caused serious damage and flooding on the island that led to a four-fold increase in leptospirosis cases and many deaths. During the lead-up to Hurricane Maria, however, many health care providers later reported that they were not notified about the need to monitor and test for the illness. This failure to detect an increase in cases early on likely contributed to the illnesses and deaths that sparked public outcry.

Given these gaps in detection, it is likely that improved disease monitoring and testing could have helped prevent the storm-associated rise in leptospirosis deaths. Choosing the best methods for surveillance in this case can be vexing. Leptospirosis, in addition to being highly variable in disease expression, can pose the added challenge of showing few clinical signs in infected individuals for weeks at a time. Because initial symptoms are indistinguishable from many other common illnesses and often do not progress beyond fever and gastrointestinal signs in terms of severity, most infections go unrecognized.

The experiences of medical and public health responders point the way toward potential improvements in leptospirosis monitoring and surveillance strategies. The U.S. Department of Veterans Affairs (VA) and CDC, which operate in multiple health campuses throughout Puerto Rico, established enhanced laboratory-based surveillance after the hurricane hit in order to monitor various infections at VA facilities for the possibility of an outbreak. Enhanced surveillance by the VA detected two DNA-confirmed cases of leptospirosis following the storm. In addition to laboratory testing of disease cases, the VA tracked groupings of infectious disease syndromes, such as pneumonia and gastrointestinal illness, as the number of total visits to emergency departments to try to identify trends for improved planning and resource allocation.

A study of disease surveillance in Puerto Rico after a period of floods caused by Hurricane Hortense in 1996 found an increase in leptospirosis infections that were caught by laboratory tests for dengue fever. The dengue tests found leptospirosis that otherwise would have most likely gone undetected and possibly fatal in some cases. This finding supports the need for readily available field laboratory testing for leptospirosis during flooding and other disruptive hydrologic events.

Bandara, et al., discussed the contribution of travel to the increasing caseload of leptospirosis in some countries. They describe an increase in reporting of leptospirosis suspected to be due to 'recreational exposure'. They claim that international travel constitutes a major independent risk factor for contracting leptospirosis and that leptospirosis is rarely included in the general differential diagnosis outside of endemic regions. Depending on the test used, there may also be difficulty in identifying the infecting serovar due to geographic variability. There may be a distribution bias, as the countries with the highest number of cases with positive leptospirosis assays from travelers whose origin is an endemic region such as the US, Netherlands, Japan, France, Germany, and Australia with appropriate testing facilities.

Monitoring invasive species can also provide insight into how Leptospira is being maintained in the environment. Rats, mice, and mongooses all contribute to spreading bacteria in rural areas. Managing these invasive species and reducing their populations could help control the spread of leptospirosis by lowering chances of exposure.

Public health authorities in endemic areas should have a responsibility to coordinate with regional authorities to monitor epidemiological trends, with the goal of identifying geographical areas that would benefit from increased service provision and education. Likewise, correspondence with tourist activities or events expected to bring masses of people together should involve measures to address primary and secondary prevention. Bandara et al., suggest prophylactic antibiotic use when individuals are involved with high-risk activities.

=== Climate ===
Warm temperatures, storms, adverse living conditions, poverty, and harmful land use policies all contribute to increased risk for leptospirosis. As global climate change continues to drive convergence of these factors, especially in tropical islands like Puerto Rico, local public health officials and their governments face a multitude of challenges. Leptospira bacteria can survive longer at higher temperatures, with more human cases observed during summer months. Increased rainfall and flooding associated with climate change opens up transmission pathways for leptospirosis and other diseases, like damaged sanitation and water treatment systems, flooded farms, and rodents or other animals seeking shelter and dry land. The projected increases in extreme precipitation events are expected to intensify the frequency of environmental conditions favorable to Leptospira survival.

Puerto Rico is at a particularly elevated risk of infectious disease outbreaks related to climate change. The island's small size, remoteness from the mainland, low socioeconomic status, and high population density all magnify the population's exposure and susceptibility to illnesses like leptospirosis. As warmer air and water lead to increased precipitation and more energetic hurricanes, the island will need to adapt and build systems that mitigate climate-linked infectious disease transmission. Public health officials will need to strengthen the essentials of urban sanitation, as flooding not only overwhelms sewer and drainage systems, but also spreads garbage and debris throughout the environment, which increases chances of transient contact between humans and animals.

Intensifying climate events and related environmental factors will continue to shape transmission of leptospirosis in places like Puerto Rico. Surveillance and predictive modeling efforts utilizing Geographic Information Science can help predict locations of future outbreaks with key factors, such as local infrastructure, rainfall effects, and human and animal population densities. Combining climate-informed predictive analytics with improved water, sanitation, and public health infrastructure will be essential to prevent endemic disease in Puerto Rico from becoming seasonal high mortality events.

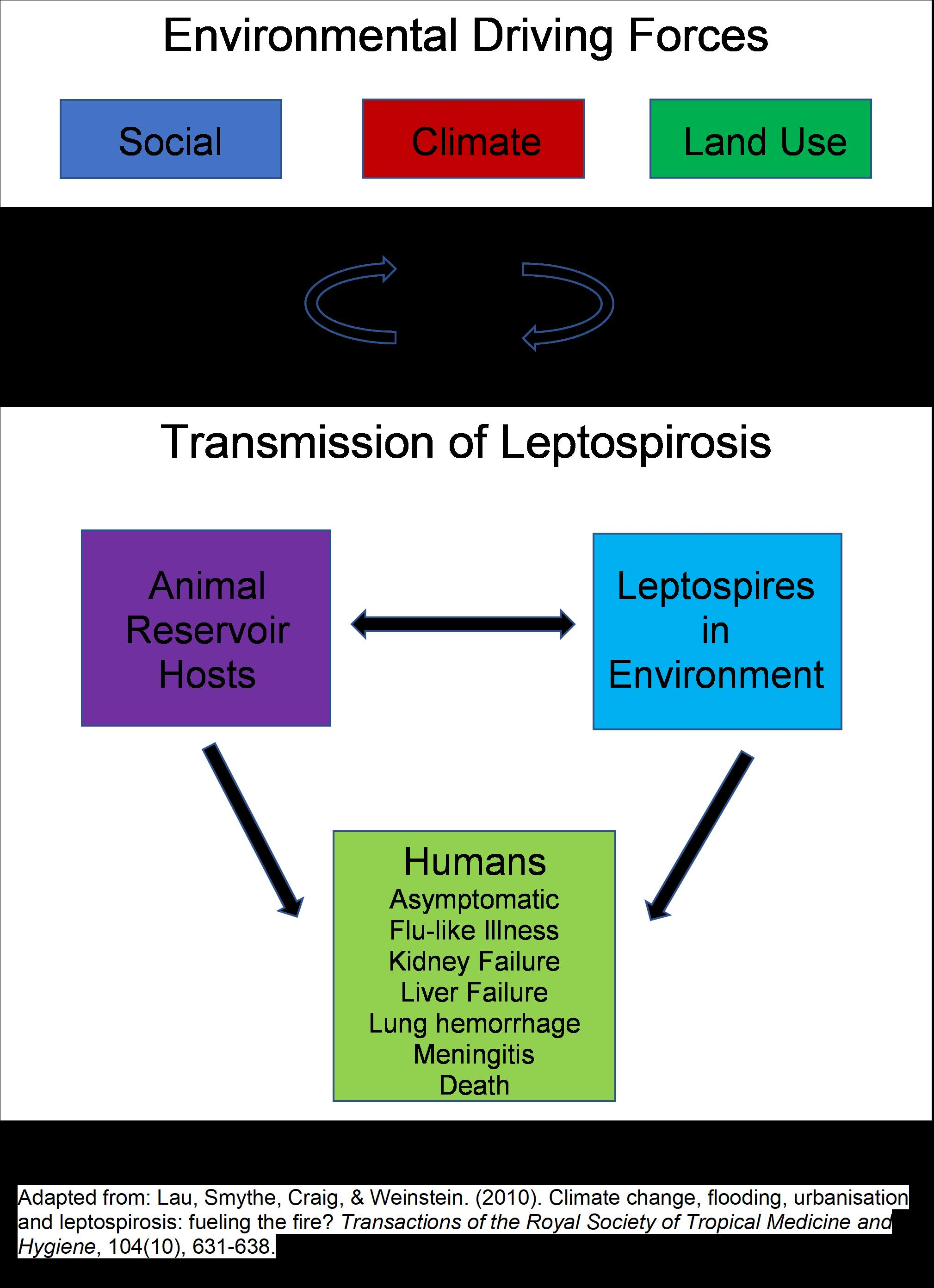
This figure shows how environmental forces impact the transmission of leptospirosis.

=== Healthcare ===
As a relatively small island with high levels of socioeconomic inequity before, Puerto Rico lacked a healthcare infrastructure capable of withstanding and fully responding to Hurricane Maria. Beyond the destructive power of the storm and floods, weeks without power and clean water took an immense toll on countless patients and an already overburdened, overworked, and underpaid workforce. People with serious illnesses had their treatments interrupted for weeks, including many who required dialysis for kidney failure. Disruptions in treatment for diabetes and other chronic illnesses underscore Puerto Rico's profound health inequities, thereby exacerbating the high rates of preventable and poorly treated physical illnesses linked to poverty, mental health, and substance use issues in the aftermath of the hurricane. Patients with chronic illness or who are immunocompromised have increased susceptibility to secondary infections. Interruptions in routine medical care following natural disasters can increase infection rates.

A key intersection of environmental and occupational health and leptospirosis prevention is the activity of healthcare, emergency response, and other disaster relief workers after heavy rainfall and flooding events. As paramedics, rescue workers, and residents wade through flood waters, they risk direct exposure to leptospira bacteria. This exposure can be mitigated with the use of protective clothing and gear, including proper coverage of wounds, but healthcare and emergency response systems in low-income urban environments often lack the awareness, training, and material resources necessary to put those precautions in place. Proper bandages, waterproof gear, abrasion-resistant gloves, and face coverings help reduce leptospirosis infections among people who have to move through flood waters. Prophylactic antibiotics to counter diseases like malaria and leptospirosis are also suggested for medical responders. The Puerto Rican government came under fire in the wake of Hurricane Maria for failing to provide protective equipment to relief workers who later contracted leptospirosis and died.

For many Puerto Ricans with chronic illnesses, pharmacies were the first line of response to the disruption in healthcare services caused by Hurricane Maria, not primary care providers. Pharmacists reported that a lack of telecommunications, electronic health records, and other essential data posed additional health risks. Improving access to pharmaceutical services and removing bureaucratic obstacles to obtaining essential medications, including psychiatric prescriptions, is a key consideration in protecting public health in the face of growing disasters.

=== Socioeconomic factors ===
Leptospirosis transmission is shaped by the complex intersections of climate, geography, and socioeconomic factors. In places like Puerto Rico, these factors converge to disproportionately affect people living in poor, urban areas that experience warm temperatures and heavy rainfall. Not only is the risk for leptospirosis in the environment higher in these areas, but its potential deadliness as an infection is also magnified by the adverse social determinants of health affecting these communities. Studies in low-income regions indicate that, even when controlling for environmental factors, socioeconomic status plays a major role in risk for leptospirosis and its severity. Communities with high levels of poverty experience higher likelihood of morbidity and mortality for leptospirosis attributable to relative socioeconomic status. To mitigate the risks associated with poverty, climate change, and endemic diseases like leptospirosis in Puerto Rico, the island's territorial government and the rest of the U.S. must address major underlying socioeconomic and political inequities. Limited access to protective gear during post‑storm cleanup negatively affects low‑income communities, increasing direct exposure to contaminated floodwater.

In the workplace and shared public environments, many pathways for leptospirosis transmission can be addressed by waste removal and occupational health precautions. The prevalence of the disease in poor, urban areas complicates this approach, as private dwellings are more likely to become sites for contact between animals, contaminated water, soil, food, and humans. Residents of these impoverished communities typically lack the resources to address such environmental risks individually, and adverse socioeconomic factors pose additional barriers to implementing widespread prevention strategies. Many people in these areas also perform the majority of the clean-up in the wake of flooding, typically without any training or protective equipment. This cleaning activity has been shown to increase infections and spread leptospirosis throughout poor urban environments. In September 2018, millions of bottles of clean water from FEMA intended for hurricane victims were found on an airport runway in Ceiba, apparently never distributed due to government mismanagement.

== See also ==
- List of epidemics
