= Prolonged field care =

Specialized type of medical care

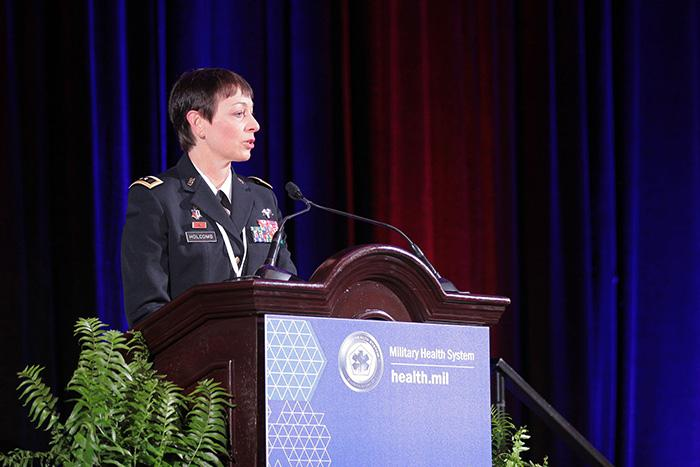
U.S. Army General Barbara Holcomb delivering a keynote speech on prolonged field care at the 2017 Military Health System Research Symposium

Prolonged field care refers to the specialized medical care provided to individuals who have sustained injuries or illnesses in situations where timely evacuation to a medical facility (or next tier of healthcare provision) is delayed, challenging, or not feasible. This concept is applicable in various contexts, including military operations, wilderness emergencies, and disaster response scenarios. Definitions exhibit slight variation, but they convey the same fundamental meaning:

"Field medical care, applied beyond doctrinal planning time-lines"

"Field medical care that is applied beyond 'doctrinal planning time-lines' by a tactical medical practitioner in order to decrease patient mortality and morbidity."

"Prolonged care is provided to casualties if there is likely to be a delay in meeting medical planning timelines"

While the concept itself is well established, since 2012 it has become rapidly codified, with changes in the global political environment and the nature of combat operations around the world. This had led to increased research and academia in the area of prolonged field care, first in Special operations teams and then more broadly.

== History ==
The concept of prolonged field care evolved from lessons learned in military conflicts, humanitarian missions, and disaster response efforts. It has become a vital component of prehospital, emergency and military medicine. Prolonged field care as a subspecialty relies on the transmission and adaptation of guidelines between civilian and military organisations. This can take the form of adapting civilian clinical practices to a military setting, undertaking civilian research to inform military practices or adapting military training for a civilian audience.

== Core capabilities ==
There are twelve core capabilities of Prolonged Field Care:

1. Monitor: Possess the capability to acquire, analyze, and comprehend a patient's vital signs, employing a reliable approach for precise documentation of observations.
2. Resuscitate: Have the equipment and competence to commence suitable fluid resuscitation to enhance patient outcomes, encompassing the administration of whole blood and blood products when necessary.
3. Ventilate & Oxygenate: Administer positive pressure ventilation while safeguarding the lungs from additional harm.
4. Airway Management: Gain control of a patient's airway to prevent hypoxia, asphyxiation and aspiration.
5. Sedation & Pain Control: Use adequate and appropriate pain control. Use sedation to accomplish any procedural tasks.
6. Physical Exam & Diagnostics: Conduct a thorough physical examination and diagnostics to gather information about the patient's current status and anticipate concealed injuries..
7. Ongoing (Nursing) Care: Continuously provide nursing care that includes maintaining the patient's warmth, cleanliness, and dryness, managing biological needs, performing wound care, and proactively preventing additional illness.
8. Advanced (Surgical) Procedures: Undertake advanced procedures essential for preserving life, reducing morbidity and enhancing overall outcomes.
9. Telemedicine: Establish telemedicine connections with medical providers capable of guiding treatment and effectively communicate the patient's condition.
10. Prepare for Evacuation: Prepare for safe evacuation by ensuring patient stability during transport and taking measures to prevent further harm.
11. Logistics: Understand the chain of care and evacuation.
12. Communication: Establish and maintain reliable communication with operational and medical control.

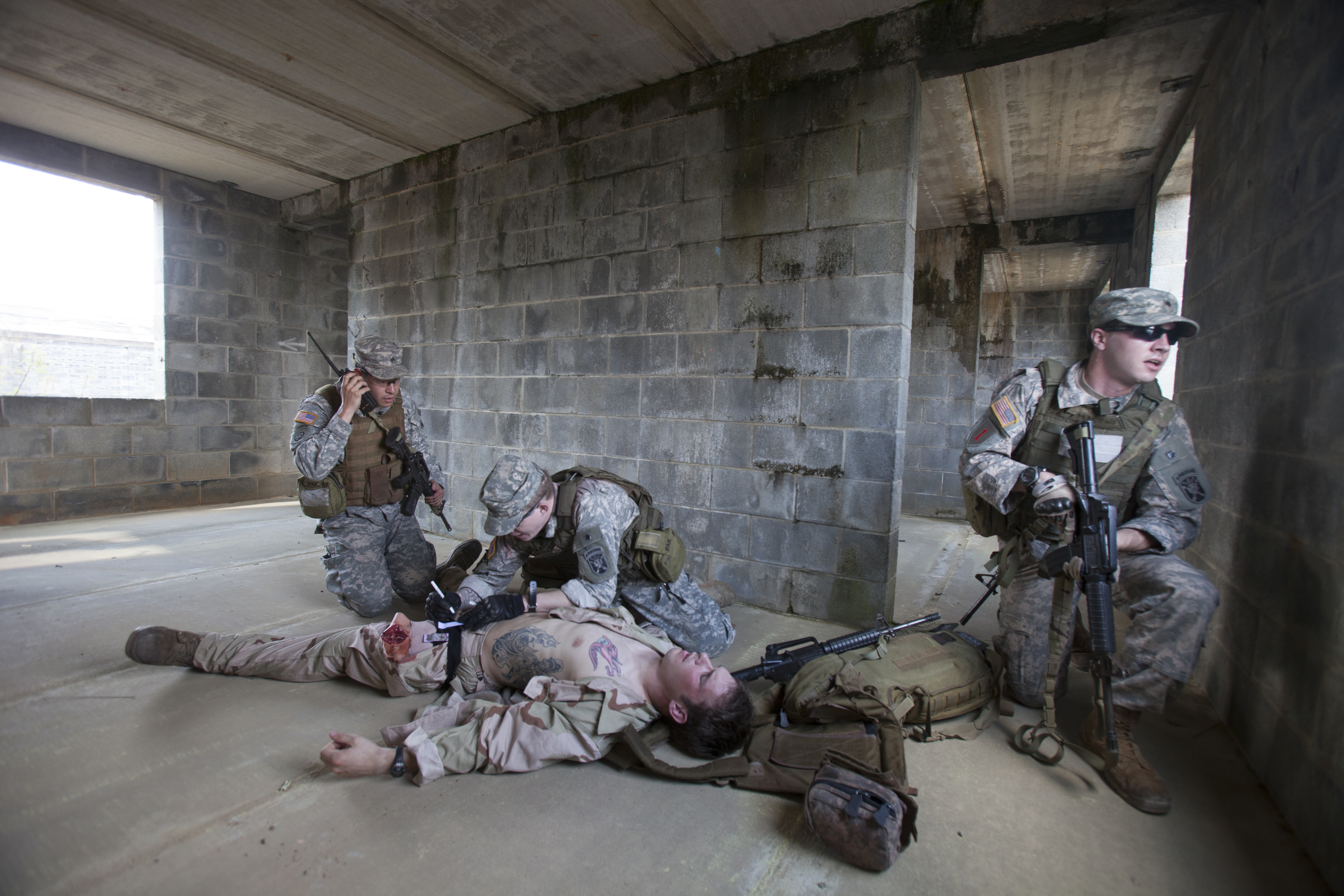
Special Warfare Medical Group training in prehospital care, this stage would be the "ruck" stage, equipment used must be carried to the patient in a rucksack

The first ten capabilities originates in military practice with the last two being later additions for a civilian audience. Each of the core capabilities can be considered in terms of Minimum, Better, Best in relation to aiming to provide a high standard level of care, and in relation to Ruck, Truck, House and Plane to discuss the stages of care and logistical issues which may limit equipment provision.

These stages of care can be further explained as:

- RUCK: the equipment and medications carried to the furthest point of an expedition or mission. Generally (or conceptually) carried in a rucksack.
- TRUCK: Additional medications and equipment carried on a transportation medium during an expedition or operation (Four-wheel drive vehicles, boats etc).
- HOUSE: Equipment and medications available at a team's house, warehouse or other staging post building.
- PLANE: Plane is used here to represent the formal medical evacuation platform, this will vary but may have the staffing, equipment and capabilities very close to the receiving hospital.

== Core interventions ==
There are two acronyms used to prompt the provision of prolonged field care after completing a Primary and Secondary Survey, those being HITMAN coined by the UK Military and SHEEPVOMIT created by the then Dean of the College of Remote and Offshore Medicine.

H
Head to Toe examination; a full secondary survey to identify illnesses or stigmata of disease.
I
Infection
T
Tubes and tidy
M
Medications
A
Administration
N
Nursing care; utilising the SHEEP VOMIT acronym.

The second acronym, SHEEP VOMIT details the nursing care needs of a patient and how best to address these.

S
Skin protection
H
Heat regulation
E
Elevate head
E
Exercises
P
Pressure points
V
Vital signs
O
Oral hygiene
M
Massage (DVT prophylaxis)
I
Ins and Outs (diet and fluid)
T
Turn / cough / deep breath

== Education ==
A number of civilian and military prolonged field care courses exist. While many follow the core capabilities outlined above some do not. Many prolonged field care courses align closely with the 12 capabilities. Typical course contents may include:

- TECC/TCCC practical scenarios
- Four Horsemen of the Apocalypse scenarios (Catastrophic Hemorrhage, Burns, Crush, TBI)
- Austere nursing care scenarios
- Austere and prehospital ultrasound (APUS)
- Disaster response / mass casualty
- Improvised medicine
- Austere Critical Care
- Austere Nursing Care
- Full-day (or longer), immersive exercise

== Terminology ==
A variety of terminology is used for the same concept, this is partly due to the differences between military and civilian practice. The following terms are used fairly interchangeably, but there may be specific differences between the association dogma, guidelines and protocols.

- Prolonged Casualty Care - A preferred civilian term
- Austere Emergency Care - A preferred civilian terminology relating to training and education
- Prolonged Field Care - A commonly used military term
- Prolonged Prehospital Care - Terminology used by the British Armed Forces in addition to Prolonged Hospital Care.

== See also ==
- Nursing care
- Wound care
- Crush syndrome
- Tactical Combat Casualty Care (TCCC)
- Wilderness medicine
