= Fulmination =

Fulmination may refer to:

- Detonation, a characteristic property of ionic chemical compounds which include the fulminate ion CNO^{−}
- A solemn political pronouncement, especially a papal bull
- Fulminant medical conditions
