= Richard Crampton =

Richard Crampton may refer to:

- Richard S. Crampton, American professor of cardiology
- R. J. Crampton, British professor of history
