= Jim Boni =

Italian-Canadian ice hockey player and executive

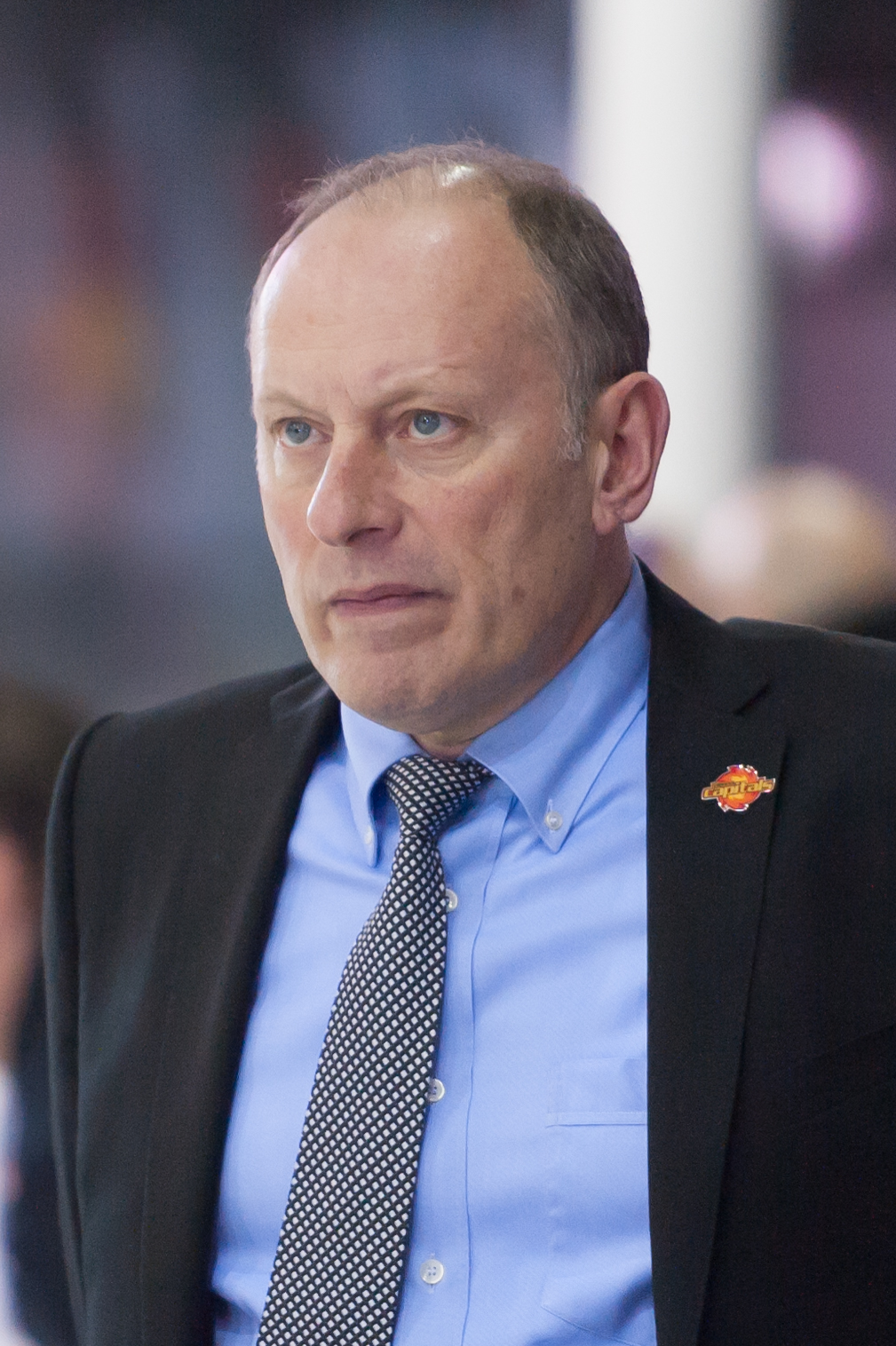
Jim Boni in 2016

Giacinto "Jim" Boni (born June 4, 1963) is an Italian-Canadian professional ice hockey coach and executive.

== Playing career ==
Born in Frosinone, Italy and raised in Canada, Boni played professionally in Italy and Germany. He won four Italian championships with HC Bolzano in 1982, 1985, 1988 and 1990. Boni spent the last two years of his career at German third-division team EC Ulm, before retiring in 1998.

In 1992, Boni struck fellow player Miran Schrott in the chest with the end of a hockey stick, causing Schrott sudden cardiac death. Boni was charged with culpable homicide, but eventually pleaded guilty to manslaughter, and he was ordered to pay restitution to Schrott's family.

== Coaching and managing career ==
Boni started his career behind the bench at ERC Ingolstadt, where he served as head coach from 1999 to January 2003. During his tenure, he led the team to promotion to the German top-flight Deutsche Eishockey Liga (DEL). He stepped aside in early January 2003.

He signed with the Vienna Capitals of the Austrian Hockey League (EBEL) for the 2003-04 season and remained in that job until the end of the 2006-07 campaign. Under his tutelage, the Capitals won the Austrian championship in 2005.

In 2007, Boni accepted the position as head coach at fellow EBEL team EHC Linz and would coach the team to back-to-back trips to the EBEL-semifinals. Boni accepted an offer to return to ERC Ingolstadt in 2009, taking the position as sport director and remained in that job until January 2014, when he requested to leave the ERC organization.

He was appointed head coach of the Vienna Capitals in February 2015, returning for a second stint in charge at the EBEL club. He guided the Capitals to the finals, shortly after taking over. Boni parted ways with the club at the end of the 2015-16 season.

== National team coaching ==
Boni was named assistant coach of Team Canada for the 2004 Loto Cup in Slovakia.

While coaching in Vienna, Boni also took over head coaching duties at the Austrian national team, beginning in 2005. He guided the team to winning the 2006 IIHF World Championship Division I, Group B and to qualification for the 2007 World Championships, where Austria finished 15th.
