= Precordium =

Portion of the body over the heart and lower chest

In anatomy, the precordium or praecordium is the portion of the body over the heart and lower chest.

Defined anatomically, it is the area of the anterior chest wall over the heart. It is therefore usually on the left side, except in conditions like dextrocardia, where the individual's heart is on the right side. In such a case, the precordium is on the right side as well.

The precordium is naturally a cardiac area of dullness. During examination of the chest, the percussion note will therefore be dull. In fact, this area only gives a resonant percussion note in hyperinflation, emphysema or tension pneumothorax.

Precordial chest pain can be an indication of a variety of illnesses, including costochondritis and viral pericarditis.

== See also ==
- Precordial thump
- Precordial examination
- Commotio cordis
- Hyperdynamic precordium
- Precordial catch syndrome
