= POCUS =

Point-of-care ultrasound, type of medical imaging

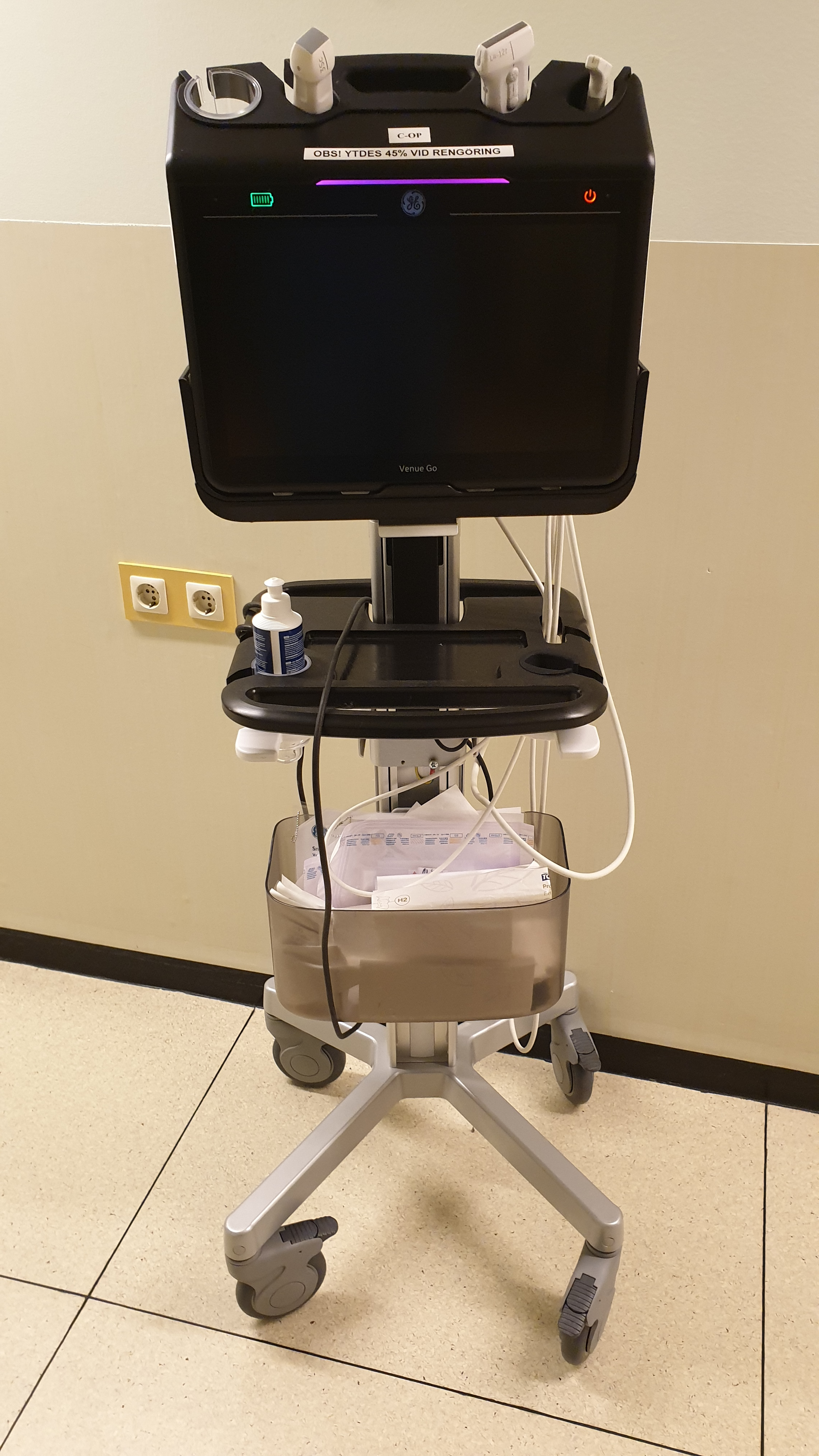
Portable ultrasound machine used for Point of Care ultrasonography.

POCUS (point-of-care ultrasonography or point-of-care ultrasound) is defined as the acquisition, interpretation, and immediate clinical integration of diagnostic medical ultrasound imaging performed by a treating clinician during an interaction with a patient rather than by a specialist such as a radiologist, cardiologist, or other consulting physician. POCUS is utilized across various medical specialties for a variety of clinical goals, and on a number of body systems to provide diagnostic information and guide procedures.

== Overview ==
POCUS has found utility in a number of clinical settings including Emergency Department, Critical Care, Obstetrics, general Inpatient Care, Orthopedics, Sports Medicine, Family Medicine, Pain Management, and Hospice and Palliative Care and is used in support of a variety of clinical goals including screening, diagnosis, monitoring care, and procedural interventions. It can be used to support management in a number of body systems including cardiovascular, pulmonary, abdominal (such as the FAST exam), obstetrical, skin and soft tissue, and musculoskeletal.

POCUS is distinct from consultative ultrasonography, where a test is ordered by a clinician, performed by a technician, and interpreted by a consulting radiologist or other specialist separately from the clinical interaction. It is also distinct from therapeutic ultrasound, where ultrasound is used for treatment of a condition or for therapeutic benefit. POCUS is performed using portable ultrasound devices such as laptop based or handheld devices which can easily brought to the patient's bedside in a hospital or emergency department setting, or into an examination room in an office based outpatient setting. It allows for rapid collection of diagnostic information which can save both time and money and improve diagnostic accuracy and overall care.

POCUS is also useful in improving performance in certain clinical procedures such as arthrocentesis, IV line placement, skin abscess drainage, nerve blocks, and many others.

== History of POCUS ==
While medical ultrasonography was developed in the mid 20th century, the approach to adoption varied from country to country. In some health care systems, for example in Germany, the technology became widely distributed and adopted by multiple specialties who incorporated ultrasound into clinical care. In those countries routine bedside ultrasonography was standard care by the 1990s. In other systems, for example in the US, ultrasonography was more limited in use and became the purview of consulting radiologists and a few other specialists, such as cardiologists and obstetricians. Probably because of the expense of the technology and barriers to learning and developing skills, adoption of bedside or point of care ultrasonography was much slower in these countries. One of the earliest expansions of point of care ultrasound occurred in the emergency department where protocols for rapid diagnosis of internal bleeding (such as the FAST exam) were developed. Other protocols emerged in the Emergency Department such as the BLUE protocol, and others. Diffusion of portable ultrasound technology to bedside hospital applications, critical care, and primary care has progressed at variable rates.

As POCUS gradually becomes more and more common as a daily bedside tool, it can sometimes provide information that formerly could only be gotten in other ways. Thus in some cases what might have been detected with a stethoscope or echocardiography may sometimes now be detected with POCUS. This effect does not entirely replace the other tools but rather only changes the patterns of their use.

== See also ==
- Emergency ultrasound
