= Fulminant =

Descriptor for events that occur suddenly and escalate quickly

Fulminant (/ˈfʊlmɪnənt/) is a medical descriptor for any event or process that occurs suddenly and escalates quickly, and is intense and severe to the point of lethality. The word comes from Latin fulmināre, to strike with lightning. There are several diseases described by this adjective:

- Fulminant liver failure
- Fulminant (Marburg variant) multiple sclerosis
- Fulminant colitis
- Fulminant pre-eclampsia
- Fulminant meningitis
- Purpura fulminans
- Fulminant hepatic venous thrombosis (Budd-Chiari syndrome)
- Fulminant jejunoileitis
- Fulminant myocarditis

Beyond these particular uses, the term is used more generally as a descriptor for sudden-onset medical conditions that are immediately threatening to life or limb. Some viral hemorrhagic fevers, such as Ebola, Lassa fever, and Lábrea fever, may kill in as little as two to five days. Diseases that cause rapidly developing lung edema, such as some kinds of pneumonia, may kill in a few hours. It was said of the "black death" (pneumonic bubonic plague) that some of its victims would die in a matter of hours after the initial symptoms appeared. Other pathologic conditions that may be fulminating in character are acute respiratory distress syndrome, asthma, acute anaphylaxis, septic shock, Sweating sickness, and disseminated intravascular coagulation.

The term is generally not used to refer to immediate death by trauma, such as gunshot wound, but can refer to trauma-induced secondary conditions, such as commotio cordis, a sudden cardiac arrest caused by a blunt, non-penetrating trauma to the precordium, which causes ventricular fibrillation of the heart. Cardiac arrest and stroke in certain parts of the brain, such as in the brainstem (which controls cardiovascular and respiratory system functions), and massive hemorrhage of the great arteries (such as in perforation of the walls by trauma or by sudden opening of an aneurysm of the aorta) may be very quick, causing "fulminant death". Sudden infant death syndrome (SIDS) is still a mysterious cause of respiratory arrest in infants. Certain infections of the brain, such as rabies, meningococcal meningitis, Acute measles encephalitis, or primary amebic meningoencephalitis can kill within hours to days after symptoms appear.

Some toxins, such as cyanide, may also provoke fulminant death. Abrupt hyperkalemia provoked by intravenous injection of potassium chloride leads to fulminant death by cardiac arrest.

== Related terms ==
- To fulminate is to hurl verbal denunciations, severe criticisms, or menacing comments at someone. Rarely, it is used in its original sense, "to kill by lightning".
- Fulminates are a class of explosives used in detonator caps. They are named for the startling suddenness with which they explode.
