= Precordial thump =

Treatment for life-threatening cardiac dysrhythmias

- Specialty: Cardiology

Precordial thump is a medical procedure used in the treatment of ventricular fibrillation or pulseless ventricular tachycardia under certain conditions. The procedure has a very low success rate, but may be used in those with witnessed, monitored onset of one of the "shockable" cardiac rhythms if a defibrillator is not immediately available. It should not delay cardiopulmonary resuscitation (CPR) and defibrillation, nor should it be used in those with unwitnessed out-of-hospital cardiac arrest.

== Procedure ==
In a precordial thump, a provider strikes at the middle of a person's sternum with the ulnar aspect of the fist. The intent is to interrupt a potentially life-threatening rhythm. The thump is thought to produce an electrical depolarization of 2 to 5 joules.

== Effectiveness ==
The precordial thump may only be effective if administered within seconds of the onset of ventricular fibrillation or pulseless ventricular tachycardia. It is not helpful for treating ventricular fibrillation if too much time has passed. It also has very low effectiveness for treating ventricular arrhythmia (possibly even making it worse), and ventricular tachycardia, especially when compared to CPR and defibrillation as alternatives.

Historically, it was recommended as the initial action to take when addressing such witnessed and monitored cardiac arrests in a hospital setting. More recently, European guidelines recommend it should no longer be routinely used with available evidence suggesting it does not improve survival to hospital discharge. However, American guidelines continue advocating its use by healthcare professionals.

== Adverse effects and appearance ==
There are concerns that the precordial thump can result in worsening of a person's heart rhythm more often than it improves it.

The use of the precordial thump technique has sometimes been shown in famous movies and television, such as in The Good Doctor Season 2 episode 5 in which it is performed by Dr. Brown, and The Resident Season 1 episode 2 in which it is performed by Conrad Hawkins, usually in passing without any explanation. Untrained laypersons have been known to attempt it, and sometimes cause additional injury to the person as the blow must be carefully aimed. If applied incorrectly it may cause further injury, for instance inducing cardiac arrest by blunt trauma, or breaking the tip of the sternum, risking fatal damage to the liver or other abdominal organs.

At one time, the technique was also taught as part of standard CPR training with the requirement that it must be administered within 60 seconds of the onset of symptoms. That time restriction, combined with a number of injuries caused by improper technique, resulted in the procedure being removed from CPR training.

== History ==
James E. Pennington and Bernard Lown at Harvard University are credited with formalizing this technique in the medical literature. They published their report in the New England Journal of Medicine in the early 1970s. Richard S. Crampton and George Craddock, at the University of Virginia helped to promote the paramedic use of chest thump through a curious accident. In 1970, the Charlottesville-Albemarle Rescue Squad (VA) was transporting a patient with an unstable cardiac rhythm in what was then called a Mobile Coronary Care Unit. When the vehicle inadvertently hit a speed bump in a shopping center parking lot, the patient's normal heart rhythm was restored. Further research confirmed that chest thumping patients with life-threatening arrhythmias could save lives.

== Fist pacing ==
Percussion pacing or fist pacing was proposed as a method of delivering mechanical pacing to someone in cardiac arrest. There is little evidence to support its use. In 1920, German physician Eduard Schott originally described percussion pacing, and a 2007 BJA article describes good benefit to this technique.
