= Hyperdynamic precordium =

- Other names: Hyperdynamic apex

Hyperdynamic precordium is a condition where the precordium (the area of the chest over the heart) moves too much (is hyper dynamic) due to some pathology of the heart. That means a forceful and hyperdynamic impulse (large amplitude that terminates quickly) can be palpated during physical examination. Hyperdynamic precordium is a physical finding which can be normal or pathological. Some possible etiologies are as followings:

- Exercise or vigorous activities
- Hypermetabolic states, such as hyperthyroidism, anemia, or high cardiac output
- Volume overload status, such as severe aortic regurgitation, severe mitral regurgitation or left-to-right shunt

In addition, hyperactive precordium indicates this physical finding with a pathologic cause which is noted by a clinician.

This problem (hyperdynamic precorrdium) can be hypertrophy of the ventricles, tachycardia, or some other heart problem.

Compared with forceful and hyperdynamic impulse finding, another abnormal finding is "forceful and sustained" impulse, which sustained through the systolic phase. The former means the ventricle is doing "volume" work, and the latter with "pressure" work (high pressure within left ventricle; some may transmit to the aorta, some may not). The latter can be seen in cases with left ventricle hypertrophy or outflow obstruction. Another possible cause of sustained impulse is heart failure with reduced ejection fraction.

Hyperdynamic precordium can also be due to hyperthyroidism, and thus indicates an increased cardiac contractility, with systolic hypertension. It may also be due to aortic coarctation, and most other congenital heart malformations.

Palpation of the chest wall can be done to assess volume changes within the heart. A hyperdynamic precordium reflects a large volume change.
