= Commotio cordis =

Disruption of heart rhythm from a blow

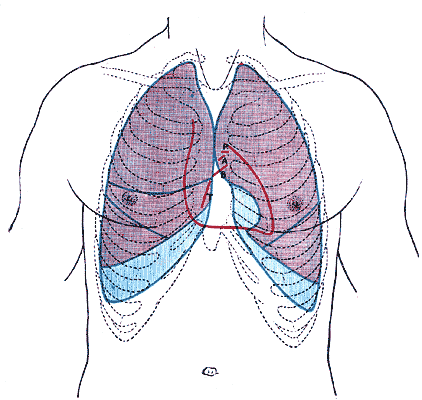
- Human adult thorax, showing the outline of the heart in red. The sensitive zone for mechanical induction of heart rhythm lies between the second and the fourth ribs, to the left of the sternum.
- Specialty: Cardiology, emergency medicine, sports medicine
- Complications: Ventricular fibrillation, quickly followed by cardiac arrest and (if not treated) death
- Usual onset: Within seconds after impact
- Causes: Sufficient blow to the precordium between 10 and 40 milliseconds before the peak of the T wave portion of normal cardiac rhythm
- Risk factors: Coronary ischemia can reduce amount of impact energy required to trigger
- Treatment: CPR, defibrillation
- Prognosis: Survival rate drops to <5% if not resuscitated within 3 minutes
- Frequency: Extremely rare

Commotio cordis (Latin, "agitation / disruption of the heart") is a disruption of heart rhythm that occurs as a result of a blow to the area directly over the heart (the precordial region) at a critical instant during the cycle of a heartbeat. The resulting sudden rise in intracavitary pressure leads to disruption of normal heart electrical activity, followed instantly by ventricular fibrillation, complete disorganization of the heart's pumping function, and cardiac arrest. It is not caused by mechanical damage to the heart muscle or surrounding organs and is not the result of heart disease.

The incidence of commotio cordis in the United States is fewer than 20 cases per year. It often occurs in boys participating in sports, most commonly in baseball when a ball strikes a player in the chest. Its rareness arises because it can occur only upon impact within a window of about 40 milliseconds in the cardiac electrical cycle.

The condition has a 97% fatality rate if not treated within three minutes. If cardiopulmonary resuscitation (CPR) combined with the use of an automated external defibrillator is employed within three minutes of the impact, survival can be as high as 58 percent.

== Assessment ==
There are only 10–20 cases annually in the United States. These cases occur mostly in boys and young men (mean age 15), usually during sports participation. It occurs most frequently in baseball when the hardball strikes an unprotected chest, although there have been cases of commotio cordis in players using a chest protector. It is usually caused by a projectile, but can also be caused by a blow from another player's elbow or other body part. Being less developed, the thorax of an adolescent is likely more prone to this injury than a mature adult.

Over a period of assessment from 2006–2012, the survival rate was 58 percent, which was an improvement over the years 1993–2006 when only 34 percent of victims survived. This increase is likely due to prompt CPR, access to defibrillation, and higher public awareness of this phenomenon.

== Potential for sudden death ==
Due to ventricular fibrillation and resultant cessation of the cardiac output to vital organs, commotio cordis has a high fatality rate, indicated by two studies to be 72–75 percent, with survival decreasing substantially if effective resuscitation was not performed within three minutes of the impact event. In a United States timeline analysis, survival was only ten percent over the years 1970–1993, while during 1994–2012, survival improved to 34 percent. A 2009 paper reported that survival drops to 3% when resuscitation is delayed beyond 3 minutes.

Higher survival rates correlated with immediate resuscitation by using CPR and an on-site automated external defibrillator—the survival rate was forty percent if resuscitation was performed within three minutes of the impact injury, contrasted with only five percent survival if resuscitation was delayed to more than three minutes after the impact. During the early 21st century, survival rates continued to improve to 58 percent of cases.

== Causes ==
=== Sports ===
Commotio cordis is a very rare event, but nonetheless it is often considered when an athlete presents with sudden cardiac death. Some of the sports which have a risk for this cause of trauma are baseball, American football, association football (soccer), ice hockey, polo, rugby football, cricket, softball, pelota, lacrosse, boxing, professional wrestling, hurling and martial arts (see Touch of Death). Children are especially vulnerable, possibly due to the mechanical properties of their thoracic skeleton. From 1996 to spring 2007, the US National Commotio Cordis Registry had 188 cases recorded, with about half occurring during organized sports. Almost all (96%) of the victims were male, the mean age of the victims during that period was 14.7 years, and fewer than one in five survived the incident.

Baseball is the most common sport in which commotio cordis occurs in regions where it is played, particularly among teenage boys who are batting or playing the positions of pitcher or catcher. Commotio cordis may occur in other sports via impacts to the chest by elbows or heads. It has also been reported outside of sports when there is a sudden impact to the chest wall by hard objects or fists.

St. Louis Blues defenceman Chris Pronger experienced commotio cordis during a playoff game on 10 May 1998, against the Detroit Red Wings when a slapshot from Dmitri Mironov struck his chest. Pronger went into cardiac arrest and was unconscious for 20 seconds while he was resuscitated by members of both the Blues' and Red Wings' training staff. Pronger made a full recovery after an overnight stay at Henry Ford Hospital in Detroit and was cleared to play again four days later. The incident ultimately had a negligible effect on his career, which lasted until 2011. Another high-profile incident occurred on 2 January 2023, during Monday Night Football when Buffalo Bills safety Damar Hamlin experienced commotio cordis after Cincinnati Bengals wide receiver Tee Higgins's helmet struck him in the chest as he was making a tackle. Hamlin collapsed and went into cardiac arrest, and his life was saved by the Bills' athletic training staff administering CPR and employing an automated external defibrillator (AED).

==== Impact factors ====
In experimental animal models in pigs studying impacts by a hard ball to the chest wall, impacts that occurred directly over the center of the left ventricle, where there is no overlying lung tissue, were the most likely to cause ventricular fibrillation. Impacts not over the heart did not cause ventricular fibrillation. Ventricular fibrillation was more easily induced in smaller, leaner animals.

The velocity of the impact by a hard object is a critical factor for the onset of commotio cordis: impacts at 40 miles per hour (64 kilometres per hour) were the most likely to cause ventricular fibrillation in an animal model. At velocities of 20 miles per hour (32 km/h), ventricular fibrillation did not occur.

Impact energies of at least 50 joules (37 foot-pounds force) may cause cardiac arrest when applied at the right time and location of the precordium of an adult. The 50-joule threshold, however, can be considerably lower when the victim's heart is under ischemic conditions, such as in coronary artery insufficiency. Contusion of the heart, involving possible rupture of a heart chamber or damage to a heart valve as may occur in a violent vehicle accident, may be called contusio cordis (from Latin for "bruising of the heart"), but is unrelated to commotio cordis.

=== Other situations ===
Commotio cordis may also occur in other situations, such as in children who are physically abused, cases of torture, and frontal collisions of motor vehicles (the impact of the steering wheel against the thorax, although this has decreased substantially with the use of safety belts and air bags). In one fatality, the impact to the chest was the result of an exploding whipped cream canister.

In contrast, the precordial thump (hard blows given over the precordium with a closed fist to revert cardiac arrest) is a sanctioned procedure for emergency resuscitation by trained health professionals witnessing a monitored arrest when no equipment is at hand, endorsed by the latest guidelines of the International Liaison Committee on Resuscitation. It has been discussed controversially, as—in particular in severe hypoxia—it may cause the opposite effect (i.e., a worsening of rhythm—commotio cordis). In a normal adult, the energy range involved in the precordial thump is five to ten times below that associated with commotio cordis.

== Mechanism ==
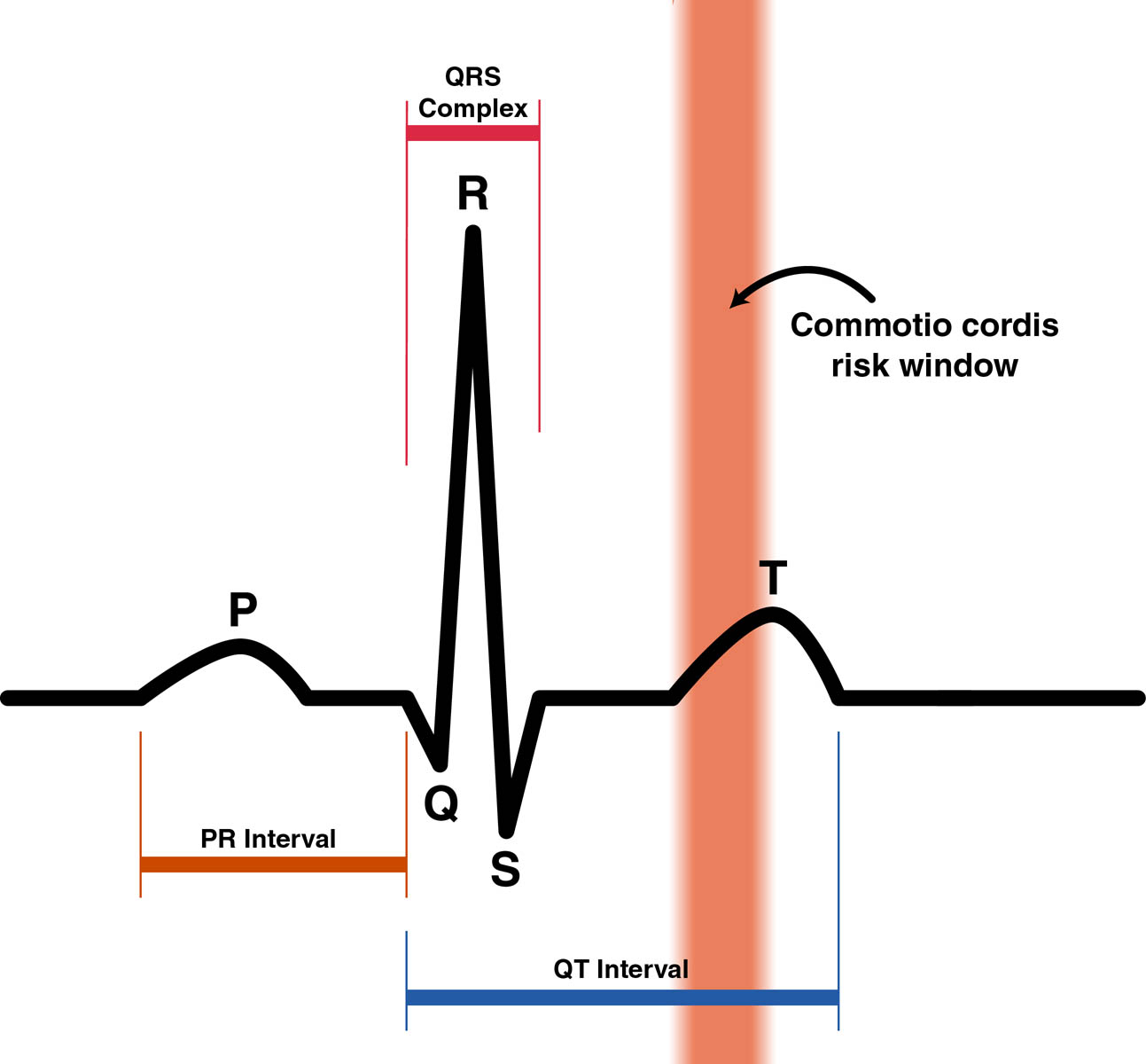
Electrocardiograph: the portion of normal sinus rhythm during which commotio cordis is a risk if a severe chest impact occurs within the narrow vulnerability window

The deviation of commotio cordis from the normal electrical rhythm of the heart is assessed scientifically in laboratory studies by analysis of the electrocardiograph (ECG) T wave (see ECG image). Only chest impacts occurring on a narrow band of the ECG during the upslope of the T wave (40 milliseconds (ms) before the peak of the T wave to the instant of the actual peak) will cause the ventricular fibrillation of commotio cordis, with an increased probability occurring when an impact happens from 30 to 10 ms before the peak of the T wave.

These factors influence the onset of commotio cordis:

- Direction of impact over the precordium (precise area, angle of impact)
- Total applied energy (area of impact versus energy, i.e., the kinetic energy of the projectile $E_\text{k} =\tfrac{1}{2} mv^2$)
- Impact occurring within a specific 10- to 30-ms portion of the cardiac cycle. This period occurs in the ascending phase of the T wave when the left ventricle is repolarizing, moving from systole to diastole (relaxation).

The small window of vulnerability in the cardiac electrical cycle explains why it is a rare event. Considering that the total cardiac cycle has a duration of one second (for a base heart rate of 60 beats per minute), the probability of impact trauma within the window of vulnerability is 1–3 percent only.

The cellular mechanisms of commotio cordis are not fully understood. However, it is widely recognized that it may be related to the mechanical impact, or stretch, on the myocardial tissue cell membranes. This impact is believed to activate the stretch-activated, pressure–sensitive proteins called ion channels. Changes in ion channels lead to altered repolarization in the heart's electrical activity, which in some cases, if occurring right at the trailing edge of a previous electrical cycle, can induce ventricular fibrillation, also known as stretch-induced VF. Since the trailing edge of the preceding electrical cycle travels over the ventricular surface, the critical window for mechanical induction of ventricular fibrillation varies locally across the ventricle.

== Risk reduction ==
For some sports participation in which hard balls are used, such as baseball or lacrosse, softer, more pliable balls may reduce the impact trauma causing commotio cordis. The shape of the impact object may be modified for some conditions, such as by using a flat object – which did not induce ventricular fibrillation upon impact in preliminary research – whereas spherical objects with smaller radii were more likely to induce ventricular fibrillation. Safety baseballs having lower degrees of hardness, e.g., softer, pliable and elastic balls used for Tee-ball or more pliable baseballs for older age groups, may reduce the risk of commotio cordis.

The risk of impact may be reduced by improved coaching techniques, such as teaching young batters to turn away from the ball to avoid errant pitches in baseball. Defensive players in lacrosse and hockey may be coached to avoid using their chest to block the ball or puck. Starting in 2017, high school lacrosse players are penalized, and play is stopped immediately if they enter their own goal crease with the apparent intent of blocking shots or acting as goalkeeper.

Chest protectors and vests are designed to reduce trauma from blunt bodily injury, but many commercially available chest protectors do not offer protection from commotio cordis and may offer a false sense of security. A 2010 study found that almost 20 percent of the victims in competitive football, baseball, lacrosse, and hockey were wearing protectors. A 2017 study found that specially designed chest protectors do reduce the risk of commotio cordis, but do not offer 100 percent protection.

In 2017, the National Operating Committee on Standards for Athletic Equipment (NOCSAE) finalized a new standard outlining performance requirements and test methods for chest protectors used in baseball and lacrosse, ND200 Standard Test Method and Performance Specification Used in Evaluating the Performance Characteristics of Chest Protectors for Commotio Cordis. Beginning in 2021, US Lacrosse made chest protectors that meet the NOCSAE ND200 standard a requirement for all goalies, and expanded coverage in 2022 to require all players to wear such a chest protector. In 2018, the National Federation of State High School Associations (NFHS) changed their baseball rules to require the catcher to wear a chest protector that meets the NOCSAE ND200 standard requirements.

== Treatment ==
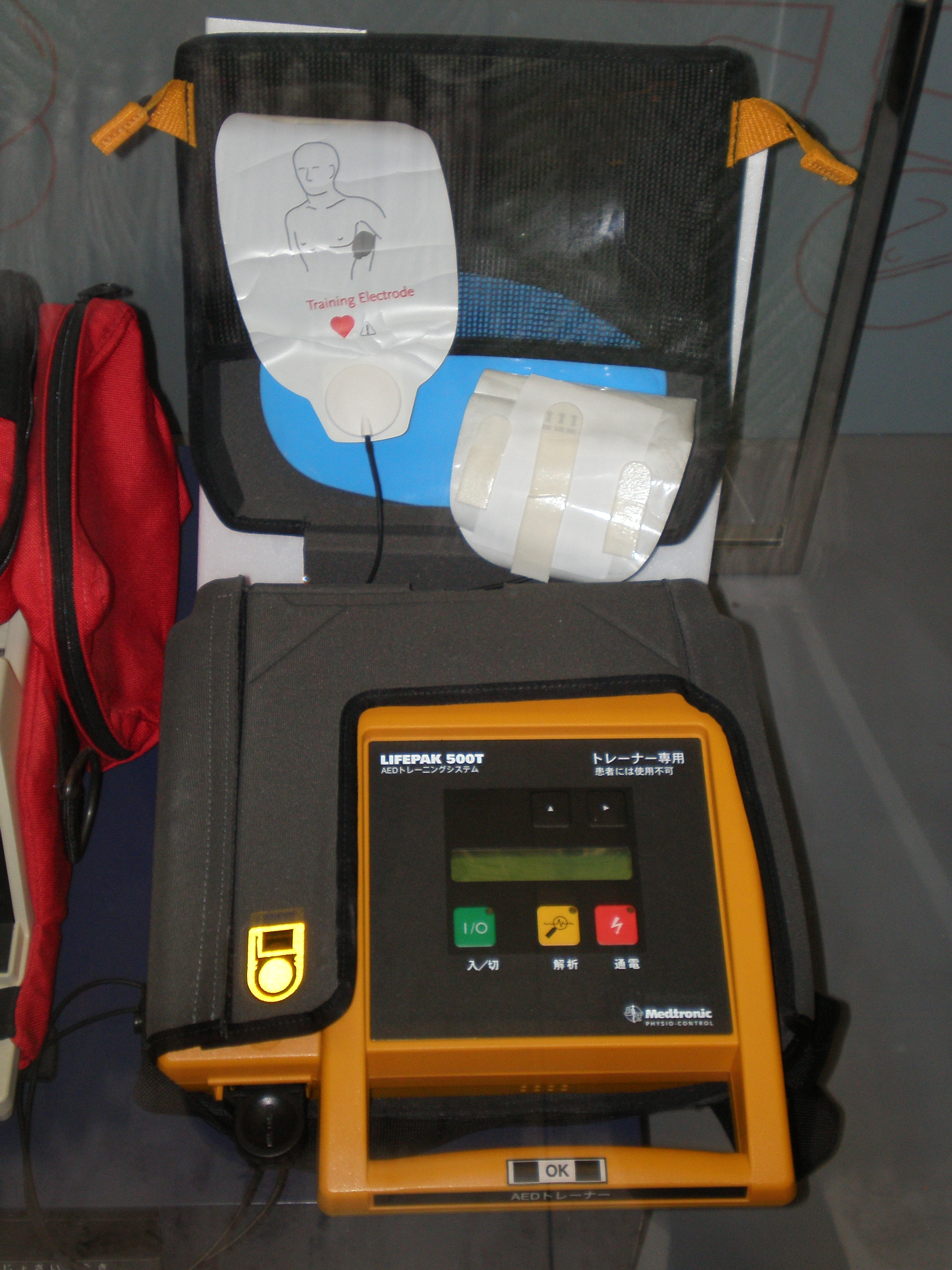
Defibrillator training kit

Automated external defibrillators (AED) and prompt CPR helped to increase the survival rate to 58 percent. CPR and defibrillation must be started urgently (within three minutes) to avoid the death of the person impacted. To assure life-saving procedures and equipment are in place at events where impact injuries are possible, clinical recommendations state that "communities and school districts reexamine the need for accessible automatic defibrillators and CPR-trained coaches at organized sporting events for children."

== Legal issues ==
Several people have been charged and convicted for the deaths of victims of commotio cordis, even when the blows rendered were never given with an intent to kill. In 1992, Italian hockey player Miran Schrott died after a blow to his chest from the stick of Italian-Canadian player Jimmy Boni. Boni was charged with culpable homicide, and eventually pleaded guilty to manslaughter, paying a $1,300 fine and $175,000 restitution to Schrott's family.

== See also ==
- Commotio thoracis
- Pulmonary contusion
- R-on-T phenomenon
- Touch of Death
