= BLUE protocol =

Standardized method for using lung ultrasound in acute hypoxic respiratory failure

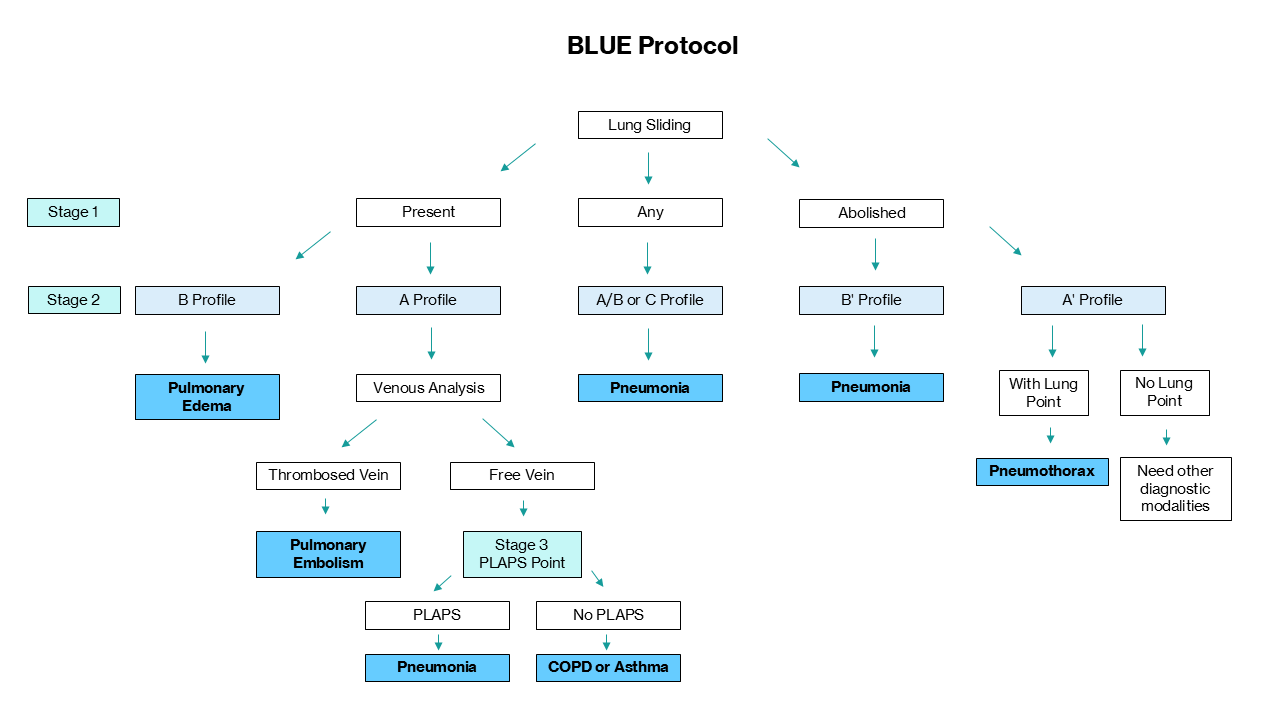
BLUE Protocol. Adapted from Lichtenstein DA, Mezière GA. Relevance of lung ultrasound in the diagnosis of acute respiratory failure: the BLUE protocol. Chest. 2008 Jul;134(1):117-25.

The BLUE (Bedside Lung Ultrasound in Emergency) protocol is a standardized method for using lung ultrasound in emergency and critical care settings. In 2008, it was introduced by Daniel Lichtenstein and Gilbert Mezière and has been used to diagnose acute respiratory failure in critically ill patients. It was first proposed in 1996 and rejected repeatedly until being accepted twelve years later. Lung ultrasound has been shown to provide timely diagnosis of acute respiratory failure in about 90% of cases. It can be performed under 3 minutes.

== Overview ==
The BLUE protocol is a systematic approach to evaluating lung pathology through ultrasound, allowing for rapid differentiation of conditions such as COPD or asthma, pneumothorax, pulmonary edema, pneumonia, and pulmonary embolism. By assessing specific lung zones and identifying characteristic ultrasound patterns, clinicians can quickly determine the cause of respiratory failure at the bedside. In the emergency department setting, the BLUE protocol can be modified for assessment of pericardial and pleural effusions.

== Methodology ==
The protocol involves scanning specific areas of the thorax using a bedside ultrasound machine. There are three standardized points to scan: upper BLUE-point, lower BLUE-point and PLAPS (posterolateral alveolar and/or pleural syndrome)-point. The interpretation of lung ultrasound findings follows established patterns, including A-lines, B-lines, lung sliding, and pleural effusions. Based on the appearance of the images, it is identified as one of the following profiles: A (A lines in all 4 BLUE points), A' (A profile without lung sliding), B (3 or more B-lines in all 4 BLUE points), B' (B profile without lung sliding), and A/B (various findings of A lines and B lines) or C (consolidation in one of the BLUE points).

== Advantages and limitations ==
The protocol offers several advantages over traditional imaging methods such as chest X-ray and CT scans. It is rapid, radiation-free, and cost-effective.

It can be limited due to operator dependence, variability in interpretation, and need for the right equipment.
