= Pre-hospital ultrasound =

Medical examination

Prehospital ultrasound is the specialized application of ultrasound by physicians and other emergency medical services (EMS) to guide immediate care and treatment procedures. Like conventional ultrasound, it is a device that produces cyclic sound pressure to penetrate a medium (different body tissues) and reveal details about the inner structure of the medium.

== Differences from conventional ultrasound ==
Many emergency physicians now view screening ultrasound as a tool, and not a procedure or study. It is primarily used to quickly and correctly ascertain a limited set of internal injuries, specifically those injuries where conventional methods of determining them, such as trauma to the torso or heart, would either take too long, require too much time to prepare, or introduce greater risk to the patient.

While conventional ultrasound can be a lengthy process, and is usually conducted with non-mobile units and advanced image filtering and manipulation built into the unit, emergency ultrasound is supposed to be as simple and quick to operate as possible, focusing on a small set of criteria.

== Applications and potential indications ==
- FAST exam (Focused assessment with sonography for trauma) to detect free intra-abdominal fluid in trauma and medical conditions
- RUSH exam to search for causes of medically related hypotension (e.g. abdominal aortic aneurysm, pulmonary embolism, ectopic pregnancy)
- Cardiac ultrasound exam in hypotensive or cardiac arrest patients to place them in one of five states: Cardiac standstill, severe hypovolemia, -cardiogenic shock, pericardial tamponade or right ventricular obstruction.
- Airway exams to verify correct placement during or after endotracheal intubation, assist in difficult intubations, and identify landmarks for surgical airways in patients presenting with difficult anatomy (e.g. obesity, neck tumor)
- Pulmonary ultrasound exam to evaluate for pneumothorax, pleural effusion, pulmonary edema, pneumonia, or other pathology
- Identification of large-vessel-occlusion stroke and possible treatment
- Fetal monitoring and evaluation in obstetric patients
- Assist in procedures (peripheral intravenous access, pericardiocentesis)
- Inferior vena cava diameter assessment to guide resuscitation
- Optic nerve sheath assessment for increased intracranial pressure
- Left ventricular function global assessment (good/poor ejection fraction)
- Abdominal Aortic Aneurysm - In patients with suspect rupture/hypotension
- Mass Casualty Triage - provides rapid diagnostic information, can better identify patient at risk for decompensation.8 US can also be utilized during a hospital mass casualty incident when other imaging sources (X-ray, CT) become overwhelmed.

== Procedural guiding ==
In most cases, prehospital providers will employ the use of a portable ultrasound unit. In every instance, an attempt is made to find the area best suited to an ultrasound and utilize bare skin if possible. Resolution is vastly decreased if soundings must be made through any form of clothing.

There are two main areas of emergency ultrasound. The Focused Assessment with Sonography for Trauma (or FAST) focuses on trying to ascertain if there is internal bodily fluid in blunt abdominal trauma, in the areas between organs, which is a sign of severe internal injury. Echocardiography is used to attempt to find valvular disease, clots, cardiomyopathies or penetrations of the heart. Both systems are scanning methodologies, they use identical equipment.

Ultrasound visualization and measurement of the optic nerve sheath diameter (ONSD) has been shown to be useful as a surrogate for more invasive intracranial pressure monitoring, allowing for more advanced monitoring of brain injuries in the field.

== Strengths ==
1. It images muscle, soft tissue, and bone surfaces very well and is particularly useful for delineating the interfaces between solid and fluid-filled spaces, unlike most other methods of trauma diagnosis, which are little more than educated guesses.
2. It renders "live" images, where the operator can dynamically select the most useful section for review, and narrows down the problem area, rather than having to wait until the patient is at the hospital.
3. It has no known long-term side effects and rarely causes any discomfort to the patient.

== Weaknesses ==
1. Sonographic devices have trouble penetrating bone. For example, sonography of the adult brain is very limited. This means that in terms of trauma diagnosis involving brain injury, sonography will be difficult and requires high-end ultrasound machines.
2. The depth penetration of ultrasound is limited, making it difficult to image structures deep in the body, especially in obese patients.
3. The method is operator-dependent. A high level of skill and experience is needed to acquire good-quality images and make accurate diagnoses, which is one more skill that a limited EMS team must develop. Since most EMS teams are small and have high turnover, retaining qualified personnel can be difficult.
4. Pre-hospital ultrasound like every exam or procedure taken out in the pre-hospital environment carries the risk to delay patient transfer to a place where more accurate diagnosis and definitive care can be given, e.g. a hospital.

== See also ==
- Duplex ultrasonography
