= Richard S. Crampton =

American cardiologist

- Education: Princeton University; University of Virginia
- Scientific career
- Workplaces: University of Virginia School of Medicine; Columbia University

Richard Savington Crampton is a professor emeritus of cardiology at the University of Virginia School of Medicine. He was involved in the development of coronary care ambulances.

Crampton was born in Norwalk, Connecticut on September 29, 1931. He studied for three years as an undergraduate at Princeton University, but enrolled in medical school at the University of Virginia without finishing his bachelor's degree. He graduated with a MD in 1956. He trained in internal medicine after medical school and specialized in cardiology at St. Luke's Hospital in New York and St. Bartholomew's Hospital in London. Crampton was on the faculty at Columbia University when he was recruited to the University of Virginia in 1969.

Crampton worked under UVA's cardiology chief Julian R Beckwith in the 1970s. Crampton had brought with him an idea for a "mobile coronary care unit" that brought a nurse or doctor, resuscitation equipment, and drugs to the scene of a medical emergency by ambulance. The unit went into service on March 8, 1971. He was the on-call cardiologist who treated former President Lyndon B. Johnson when he suffered a heart attack in 1972 while visiting family in Charlottesville, VA. His mobile coronary care unit received media attention after this early high-profile success story.

He later served on the Emergency Medical Services Committee of the National Academy of Sciences and National Research Council.

UVA has awarded the "Richard Savington Crampton Visiting Lectureship in Cardiovascular Medicine" since 2000.
