= HEENT examination =

Portion of a physical examination

A HEENT examination is a portion of a physical examination that principally concerns the head, eyes, ears, nose, and throat.

== Steps ==
- IPPA
  - Inspection of scars or skin changes
  - Palpation of temporomandibular joint, thyroid, and lymph nodes
  - Percussion may involve the skin above the frontal sinuses and paranasal sinuses to detect any signs of pain
  - Auscultation for carotid bruits
- Tests specific to HEENT examination
  - Eyes: eye examination and acuity (including ophthalmoscope)
  - Ears: hearing examination and evaluation of tympanic membrane (TM) (otoscope used in evaluation of ears, nose, and mouth)

A neurological examination is usually considered separate from the HEENT evaluation, although there can be some overlap in some cases.

== Sample write-up ==
Category	Item	Sample text
Head		"NC/AT" or "Normocephalic, atraumatic"
Eyes	ophthalmoscope	"EOM intact, PERRLA, anicteric, no injection, fundus WNL (within normal limits), no papilledema"
Ears	otoscope	"TM intact, noninflamed"
Nose	otoscope	"No congestion"
Throat	otoscope	"Oropharynx WNL" or "no erythema or exudate"
Mouth	otoscope	"Moist mucous membranes, no thrush, no vesicles, no lesions, good dentition"
Neck		"No LAD, thyroid WNL, neck supple" (JVD and bruit may be reported here or in CV)
