= Ippa (disambiguation) =

Ippa or IPPA may refer to one of the following:

- Ippa, a genus of insects
- IPPA, four steps of physical examination in medicine
- The International Pitch and Putt Association, the second-established of the two global governing bodies of pitch and putt
- IPPA The Irish Professional Photographers Association
- IPPA, International Positive Psychology Association, an association which promotes positive psychology
