= Cardiology diagnostic tests and procedures =

- Specialty: Cardiology
- ICD-9-CM: 89.4-89.6
- MeSH: D006334
- [edit on Wikidata]

The diagnostic tests in cardiology are methods of identifying heart conditions associated with healthy vs. unhealthy, pathologic heart function.

== Bedside ==
=== History ===
Obtaining a medical history is always the first "test", part of understanding the likelihood of significant disease, as detectable within the current limitations of clinical medicine. Yet heart problems often produce no symptoms until very advanced, and many symptoms, such as palpitations and sensations of extra or missing heart beats correlate poorly with relative heart health vs disease. Hence, a history alone is rarely sufficient to diagnose a heart condition.

=== Auscultation ===
Auscultation employs a stethoscope to more easily hear various normal and abnormal sounds, such as normal heart beat sounds and the usual heart beat sound changes associated with breathing versus heart murmurs.

== Laboratory ==
=== Blood tests ===
A variety of blood tests are available for analyzing cholesterol transport behavior, HDL, LDL, triglycerides, lipoprotein little a, homocysteine, C-reactive protein, blood sugar control: fasting, after eating or averages using glycated albumen or hemoglobin, myoglobin, creatine kinase, troponin, brain-type natriuretic peptide, etc. to assess the evolution of coronary artery disease and evidence of existing damage. A great many more physiologic markers related to atherosclerosis and heart function are used and being developed and evaluated in research.

Cardiology diagnostic tests
Test Name	Lower/normal risk	High risk	Cost $US (approx)
Total Cholesterol	<200 mg/dL	>240 mg/dL	
LDL-C	<100 mg/dL	>160 mg/dL	$150*
HDL-C	>60 mg/dL	<40 mg/dL	
Triglyceride	<150 mg/dL	>200 mg/dL	
Blood Pressure	<120/80 mmHg	>140/90 mmHg	
C-reactive protein	<1 mg/L	>3 mg/L	$20
Fibrinogen	<300 mg/dL	>460 mg/dL	$100
Homocysteine	<10 μmol/L	>14 μmol/L	$200
Fasting Insulin	<15 μIU/mL	>25 μIU/mL	$75
Ferritin	male 12–300 ng/mL female 12–150 ng/mL		$85
Lipoprotein(a) - Lp(a)	<14 mg/dL	>19 mg/dL	$75
Coronary calcium scan	<100	>300	$250–600

(*) due to the high cost, LDL is usually calculated instead of being measured directly
source: Beyond Cholesterol, Julius Torelli MD, 2005 ISBN 0-312-34863-0

== Electrophysiology ==
=== Electrocardiogram ===
Electrocardiography (ECG/EKG in German vernacular. Elektrokardiogram) monitors electrical activity of the heart, primarily as recorded from the skin surface. A 12 lead recording, recording the electrical activity in three planes, anterior, posterior, and lateral is the most commonly used form. The ECG allows observation of the heart electrical activity by visualizing waveform beat origin (typically from the sinoatrial or SA node) following down the bundle of HIS and ultimately stimulating the ventricles to contract forcing blood through the body. Much can be learned by observing the QRS morphology (named for the respective portions of the polarization/repolarization waveform of the wave, P,Q,R,S,T wave). Rhythm abnormalities can also be visualized as in slow heart rate bradycardia, or fast heart rate tachycardia.

=== Fasegram ===
A Fasegraphy allows expanding the system of Electrocardiography diagnostic features, based on the evaluation of the speed characteristics of the process, and thereby increasing the sensitivity and specificity of ECG-diagnostics.

Fasegraphy allows determining the initial features of changes in the cardiac muscle, even on a single-channel ECG, which are underestimated in traditional ECG diagnostics.

=== Holter monitor ===
A Holter monitor records a continuous EKG rhythm pattern (rarely a full EKG) for 24 hours or more. These monitors are used for suspected frequent rhythm abnormalities, especially ones the wearer may not recognize by symptoms. They are more expensive than event monitors.

=== Event monitor ===
An event monitor records short term EKG rhythm patterns, generally storing the last 2 to 5 minutes, adding in new and discarding old data, for 1 to 2 weeks or more. There are several different types with different capabilities. When the wearer presses a button on the monitor, it quits discarding old and continues recording for a short additional period. The wearer then plays the recording, via a standard phone connection, to a center with compatible receiving and rhythm printing equipment, after which the monitor is ready to record again. These monitors are used for suspected infrequent rhythm abnormalities, especially ones the wearer does recognize by symptoms. They are less expensive than Holter monitors.

=== Cardiac stress testing ===
Cardiac stress testing is used to determine to assess cardiac function and to disclose evidence of exertion-related cardiac hypoxia. Radionuclide testing using thallium or technetium can be used to demonstrate areas of perfusion abnormalities. With a maximal stress test the level of exercise is increased until the person's heart rate will not increase any higher, despite increased exercise. A fairly accurate estimate of the target heart rate, based on extensive clinical research, can be estimated by the formula 220 beats per minute minus patient's age. This linear relation is accurate up to about age 30, after which it mildly underestimates typical maximum attainable heart rates achievable by healthy individuals. Other formulas exist, such as that by Miller (217 - (0.85 × Age)) and others. Achieving a high enough heart rate at the end of exercise is critical to improving the sensitivity of the test to detect high grade heart artery stenosis. High frequency analysis of the QRS complex may be useful for detection of coronary artery disease during an exercise stress test.

=== Electrophysiology study ===
The electrophysiology study or EP study is the end all of electrophysiological tests of the heart. It involves a catheter with electrodes probing the endocardium, the inside of the heart, and testing the conduction pathways and electrical activity of individual areas of the heart.

== Medical imaging ==
Cardiac imaging techniques include coronary catheterization, echocardiogram, intravascular ultrasound, retinal vessel analysis and the coronary calcium scan.

== See also ==
- Cardiology
- Reference ranges for common blood tests
- Medical technologist
