= Stewart Wolf =

American physician and researcher

- Born: January 12, 1914; Baltimore, Maryland
- Died: September 24, 2005 (aged 91); Oklahoma City, Oklahoma
- Education: Yale University, Johns Hopkins University
- Known for: Roseto effect
- Scientific career
- Fields: Psychosomatic medicine
- Institutions: University of Oklahoma, Oklahoma Medical Research Foundation, University of Texas Medical Branch

Stewart George Wolf Jr. (January 12, 1914—September 24, 2005) was an American physician and researcher in the field of psychosomatic medicine.

== Early life and education ==
Wolf was born on January 12, 1914, to Stewart George Wolf, a Baltimore businessman, and his wife, Angeline Griffing Wolf. He graduated from Phillips Academy, after which he attended Yale University before transferring from there to Johns Hopkins University, where he received his medical degree in 1938. He then completed his internship at Cornell-New York Hospital.

== Career ==
During World War II, Wolf ran a 1,000-bed hospital in the South Pacific Area. In 1952, Wolf became the first full-time head of the Department of Medicine at the University of Oklahoma, as well as the head of the neuroscience section of the Oklahoma Medical Research Foundation. In 1958, he founded the Totts Gap Medical Research Laboratories in Bangor, Pennsylvania. In 1969, he left the University of Oklahoma to found and direct the Marine Biomedical Institute at the University of Texas Medical Branch.

== Research ==
Although he originally studied digestion, Wolf is known for his research into the Roseto effect, which he became interested in while talking to a local doctor in 1961, and which he published a study about in 1963. In this study, he suggested the reason people living in Roseto, Pennsylvania had fewer heart attacks was because of their close family relationships. He also published a study on the placebo effect in nausea in 1950 which has been called "seminal" and "one of the earliest reports on the power of placebo" by Irving Kirsch.

== Death ==
Wolf died on September 24, 2005, at Epworth Villa Alzheimers Care and Study Center in Oklahoma City, at the age of 91.
