= Doximity =

U.S. information technology company

Doximity, Inc.
- Formerly: 3MD Communications, Inc.
- Type: Public
- Traded as: NYSE: DOCS (Class A); S&P 400 component
- Industry: Internet
- Founded: June 2010; 16 years ago
- Founders: Nate Gross; Jeff Tangney; Shari Buck
- Headquarters: San Francisco, California, U.S.
- Key people: Jeff Tangney (CEO)
- Revenue: ▲US$475.4 million (2024)
- Operating income: ▲US$163.9 million (2024)
- Net income: ▲US$147.6 million (2024)
- Total assets: ▼US$1,079.4 million (2024)
- Total equity: ▼US$901.4 million (2024)
- Number of employees: 827 (2024)
- Website: doximity.com
- Footnotes; Financials as of March 31, 2024.

Doximity is an online networking service for medical professionals. Launched in 2010, the platform offers its members curated medical news, telehealth tools, and case collaboration.

== History ==
The company was launched in March 2011 by co-founders Nate Gross, Jeff Tangney and Shari Buck. In 2013, founder Jeff Tangney remained CEO while the company was based in San Mateo, California. By 2013, it became one of the largest networks for U.S. healthcare professionals, with approximately 10 percent of U.S. doctors as members.

By the beginning of 2014, 40 percent of U.S. physicians became members. In 2016, it began offering a free service for doctors to call patients using their work number on their mobile phones. In 2018, the company announced that it had reached 1 million members, accounting for more than 70 percent of U.S. physicians. In 2021, Doximity served more than 2 million registered members, including over 80 percent of U.S. physicians and over 50 percent of nurse practitioners and physician assistants.

In 2016, the company was ranked #6 on the Deloitte Technology Fast 500 list. In November 2019, Doximity was listed on the Deloitte Technology Fast 500 list for the fourth consecutive year. In May 2020, the company added video. Dialer Video, a video telehealth app, allows physicians to video call patients through personal smartphones. In June 2020, Doximity Acquires THMED and launches the Curative Brand. Curative is a staffing and recruiting company offering permanent and Locum/Temporary placement services.

In May 2021, Doximity, a professional network for physicians with telehealth and scheduling tools, filed for an initial public offering (IPO) seeking to raise $100 million. Morgan Stanley, Goldman Sachs and J.P. Morgan Securities were the lead underwriters for the IPO. Doximity raised nearly $606 million in its IPO. In its June 2021 IPO on the NYSE, gave it a market cap shortly after its debut of $9.4 billion.

In 2021 August, CNBC reported that the site's news feed was "inundated" with vaccine misinformation shared among physicians, despite Doximity's community guidelines banning medical misinformation. At the time, 80% of its revenue came from ads paid by pharmaceutical firms and hospitals, and directed at physicians on the site. In November 2023, Doximity released DocDefender, a free service that removed a physician's personal phone numbers and addresses from public websites.

== Investors ==
In April 2014, the company announced it had raised a $54 million financing round led by the venture capital firm Draper Fisher Jurvetson and the mutual fund company T. Rowe Price. Morgan Stanley Investment Management also invested. This investment brought Doximity's total funding to $81 million. Doximity received $10.8 million in venture capital funding from Emergence Capital Partners and Interwest Partners in March 2011, and $17 million in Series B funding led by Morgenthaler Ventures in September 2012.

== Products and services ==
=== Dialer ===
In 2016, Doximity built Dialer, a free communication tool for physicians to call their patients. The Doximity Dialer app allows physicians to call patients from their personal cell phone, and the patient sees the doctor's office number on caller ID.

=== Dialer Video ===
In May 2020, Doximity released Dialer Video, a telemedicine tool that allows physicians to video call their patients directly from their own smartphones. In July 2020, Doximity said that more than 100,000 U.S. Doctors use Dialer Video, its telemedicine app.

== Acquisition ==
In June 2020, Doximity acquired THMED, a healthcare company. Following the purchase, THMED changed its name to Curative and started concentrating on customized medical-personnel queries. In February 2022, Doximity acquired Amion, an on-call doctor scheduling company. In August 2025, Doximity acquired Pathway Medical, a Canadian startup specializing in medical AI and evidence-based clinical reference tools.

== See also ==
- QuantiaMD, a defunct mobile and online community and collaboration platform for physicians
