= Roseto, Pennsylvania =

Borough in Pennsylvania, US

Borough of Roseto
- Borough
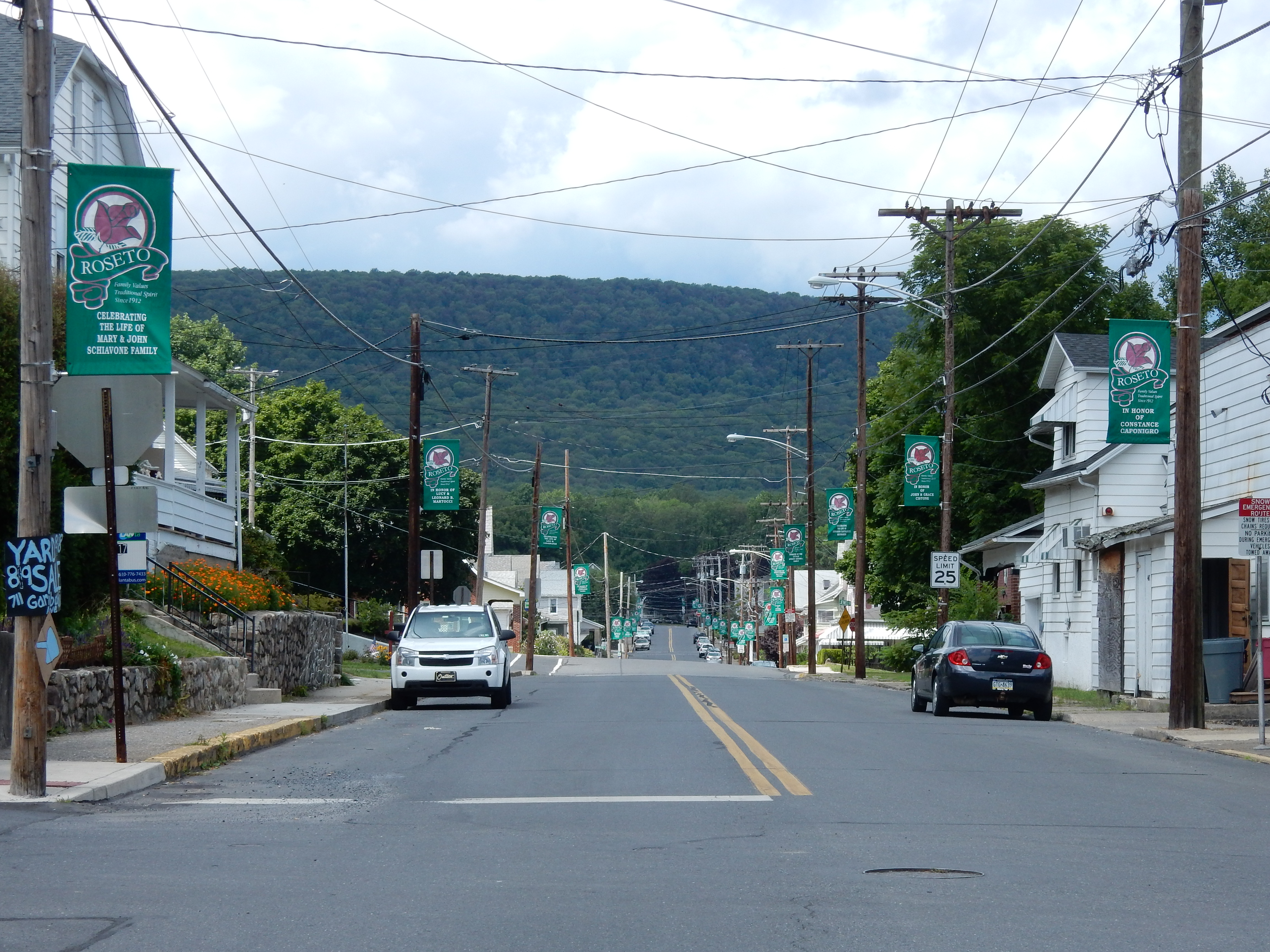
- Garibaldi Avenue in Roseto in August 2015

- Seal

- Location of Roseto in Northampton County, Pennsylvania (left) and of Northampton County in Pennsylvania (right)

- Location of Roseto in Pennsylvania Roseto (the United States)
- Coordinates: 40°52′50″N 75°13′02″W
- Country: United States
- State: Pennsylvania
- County: Northampton

Government
  - Mayor: Ilene R. Tillman

Area
  - Borough: 0.63 sq mi (1.64 km^{2})
  - Land: 0.63 sq mi (1.63 km^{2})
  - Water: 0.0077 sq mi (0.02 km^{2})
- Elevation: 794 ft (242 m)

Population (2020)
  - Borough: 1,581
  - Density: 2,514.9/sq mi (971.01/km^{2})
  - Metro: 865,310 (US: 68th)
- Time zone: UTC-5 (EST)
  - Summer (DST): UTC-4 (EDT)
- ZIP Code: 18013
- Area codes: 610 and 484
- FIPS code: 42-66168
- School district: Bangor Area School District
- Website: boroughroseto.com

Roseto (locally /ˌroʊzɛtə/) is a borough in Northampton County, Pennsylvania, United States. The population of Roseto was 1,581 at the 2020 census. Roseto is part of the Lehigh Valley metropolitan area, which has a population of 861,899 and is the 68th most populated metropolitan area in the U.S. as of the 2020 census.

Roseto is known in the fields of sociology and cardiology for the Roseto effect, wherein the close-knit Italian American community exhibited half the national average rate of heart disease in the mid-20th century. This finding helped to establish that stress can contribute to heart disease.

== History ==
Roseto, meaning "Rose garden" in Italian, is named for the village of Roseto Valfortore. Neighboring communities were settled primarily by those of German, English, and Welsh descent. The first Italian immigrants from Roseto Valfortore, Italy arrived in 1882 to work in the local slate quarries. The Wind Gap and Delaware Railroad opened a line through the town in 1883. It was operated by the Central Railroad of New Jersey until 1905, after which it was merged into the Lehigh and New England Railroad; LNE abandoned the line in 1955. Roseto was incorporated as a borough in 1912.

In 1974, folklorist Carla Bianco studied Roseto and its inhabitants in her important The Two Rosetos, published by Indiana University Press. She compared Roseto to the mountain town where its name and most of its original settlers had come from, Roseto Valfortore in the Apulia region of southern Italy. Bianco calculated that "95 percent of its present 1,600 inhabitants are still descendants of Roseto Valfortore". A local doctor also noticed positive health rates in Roseto, leading to a study that identified the Roseto effect in public health.

== Geography ==
Roseto is located at 40°52′50″N 75°13′2″W (40.880576, -75.217345). According to the U.S. Census Bureau, the borough has a total area of 0.6 square miles (1.6 km^{2}), 0% of it being water.

== Transportation ==
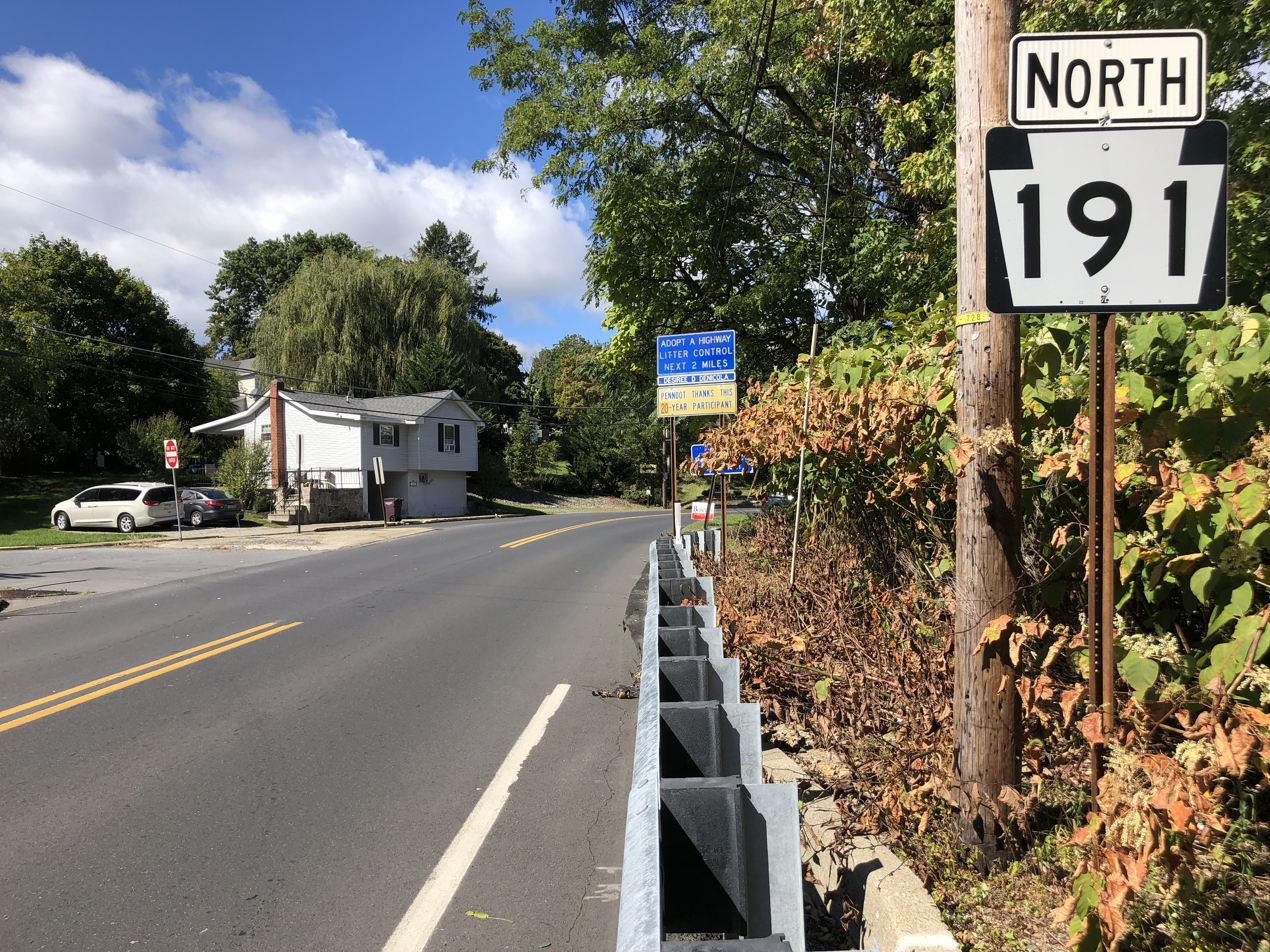
PA Route 191 northbound in Roseto

As of 2017, there were 9.08 miles (14.61 km) of public roads in Roseto, of which 1.64 miles (2.64 km) were maintained by the Pennsylvania Department of Transportation (PennDOT) and 7.44 miles (11.97 km) were maintained by the borough.

Pennsylvania Route 191 and Pennsylvania Route 512 are the numbered highways serving Roseto. PA 191 follows Roseto Avenue and First Street along a north-south alignment through the eastern part of the borough. PA 512 follows Blue Valley Drive along an east-west alignment along the southwestern edge of the borough.

== Demographics ==
Historical population
Census	Pop.	Note	%±
1920	1,634		—
1930	1,746		6.9%
1940	1,778		1.8%
1950	1,676		−5.7%
1960	1,630		−2.7%
1970	1,538		−5.6%
1980	1,484		−3.5%
1990	1,555		4.8%
2000	1,653		6.3%
2010	1,567		−5.2%
2020	1,581		0.9%

As of the 2000 census, there were 1,653 people, 640 households, and 476 families residing in the borough. The population density was 2,634.5 inhabitants per square mile (1,017.2/km^{2}). There were 670 housing units at an average density of 1,067.8 per square mile (412.3/km^{2}). The racial makeup of the borough was 98.85% White, 0.36% Asian, 0.18% African American, 0.18% from other races, and 0.42% from two or more races. Hispanic or Latino of any race were 1.94% of the population.

There were 640 households, out of which 33.6% had children under the age of 18 living with them, 57.3% were married couples living together, 11.7% had a female householder with no husband present, and 25.6% were non-families. 22.2% of all households were made up of individuals, and 11.4% had someone living alone who was 65 years of age or older. The average household size was 2.58 and the average family size was 3.04.

In the borough, the population was spread out, with 25.2% under the age of 18, 7.1% from 18 to 24, 28.9% from 25 to 44, 19.2% from 45 to 64, and 19.5% who were 65 years of age or older. The median age was 38 years. For every 100 females there were 89.3 males. For every 100 females age 18 and over, there were 87.3 males. The median income for a household in the borough was $39,813, and the median income for a family was $45,833. Males had a median income of $36,563 versus $21,750 for females. The per capita income for the borough was $17,419. About 5.7% of families and 7.2% of the population were below the poverty line, including 9.4% of those under age 18 and 8.7% of those age 65 or over.

== Public education ==
Roseto is served by Bangor Area School District. Students in grades nine through 12 attend Bangor Area High School in Bangor. Faith Christian School is also located in the borough.
