= Souffle (heart sound) =

A souffle (English: /ˈsuːfəl/) (Note: Naturalized in English as /ˈsuːfəl/, from French souffle, "a puff of air"; it is not to be confused with soufflé (English: /suːˈfleɪ/), which is cognate but reflects another French noun coming from nominalization of the participial adjective; the difference is that between "a blow" and "blown", that is, "a puff of air" versus "a thing puffed up by a puff of air".) is a vascular or cardiac murmur with a blowing quality when heard on auscultation. It is particularly used to describe vascular murmurs or transmitter heart sounds which occur during pregnancy, either from the uterus and breasts of the mother, or from the fetus.

== Uterine souffle ==
Uterine souffle or placental souffle is a soft, blowing sound heard using a stethoscope, usually in the second trimester of pregnancy (13–28 weeks). This sound is heard most clearly in the lower part of the uterus and is synchronous with the pulse of the mother. The uterine souffle is produced by the rush of blood through the dilated vessels of the uterus. On auscultation, uterine souffle may often be confused with funic souffle, which is a sharp, whistling sound that is synchronous with the pulse of the foetus. Therefore, the maternal pulse must be palpated simultaneously in order to confirm uterine souffle. Uterine souffle is considered as a probable objective sign of pregnancy.

== Funic souffle ==
Funic souffle (also known as funicular or fetal souffle), is a blowing sound heard in synch with fetal heart sounds, and may originate from the umbilical cord. It has also been described as a sharp, whistling sound that is synchronous with the pulse of the foetus, usually heard during the second trimester of pregnancy (13–28 weeks). It is heard because of the rush of blood through the umbilical arteries of the foetus, and is therefore synchronous with the foetal pulse. The funic souffle is not heard consistently. On auscultation, funic souffle may often be confused with uterine souffle, which is a soft, blowing sound synchronous with the maternal pulse. Therefore, the maternal pulse must be palpated simultaneously in order to differentiate uterine souffle from funic souffle.

== Mammary souffle ==
A mammary souffle is a maternal cardiac murmur heard over the breasts.

A mammary souffle is present in late pregnancy or during lactation. It is a benign continuous heart sound, which disappear after lactation. It's supposed to arise from superficial arteries supplying the lactating breast and for that reason called a "mammary souffle."

The following characters of this murmur are emphasized. It may occur throughout systole and diastole (some reports only noting it during systolic phase). Its quality (primarily systolic, high-pitched, around left sternal border) may closely simulate Patent Ductus Arteriosus (PDA). The distinguishing properties are its variation in position from time to time (left or right, second or third even fourth interspace close to sternum), its evanescence (not always can be heard during pregnancy period) and its disappearance on firm pressure with the stethoscope.
