= Acta Cardiologica =

- Discipline: Cardiology
- Language: English
- Edited by: P. Lancellotti

Publication details
- History: 1934–present
- Publisher: Belgian Society of Cardiology (Belgium)
- Frequency: Bimonthly
- Impact factor: 1.718 (2020)

Standard abbreviations
- ISO 4: Acta Cardiol.

Indexing
- ISSN: 0001-5385

Links
- Journal homepage

Acta Cardiologica is a bimonthly peer-reviewed medical journal covering research on all aspects of cardiovascular disease including observational studies, clinical trials, experimental investigations with clear clinical relevance, and tutorials.

According to the Journal Citation Reports, the journal has a 2020 impact factor of 1.718. According to the SCImago Journal Rank (SJR), the journal h-index is 41, ranking it to Q3 in Cardiology and Cardiovascular Medicine and Medicine (miscellaneous).

== Abstracting and indexing ==
The journal is abstracted and indexed in:

- MEDLINE/PubMed
- Science Citation Index Expanded
- Scopus
- BIOSIS Previews
- Embase
