= Uhl anomaly =

- Uhl anomaly is inherited via autosomal dominant manner
- Specialty: Medical genetics

Uhl anomaly is a rare cardiac malformation that was first identified by Dr. Henry Uhl in 1952. It is characterized by the absence of the right ventricle (RV) myocardium, either entirely or partially, and the replacement of the RV myocardium by nonfunctional fibroelastic tissue that resembles parchment. As of 2010 fewer than 100 cases have been reported in literature.

Patients will typically present as infants with right-sided heart failure. Atrial right-to-left shunting is frequently observed as the cause of cyanosis.

Typically, magnetic resonance imaging, computed tomography, and echocardiography are used to make the diagnosis.

== Signs and symptoms ==
Infants may exhibit severe cyanosis and right heart failure at birth, though these conditions may get better as pulmonary vascular resistance decreases. The main clinical features in older patients are right heart failure symptoms and signs.

== Causes ==
Although the precise cause of Uhl's anomaly is unknown, there have been reports of primary nondevelopment of myocytes, selective apoptosis, and cardiomyocyte overexpression of vascular endothelial growth factor. A sporadic mutation could indicate that genetics is the underlying cause.

== Mechanism ==
The pathophysiological outcome of Uhl anomaly involves compromised diastolic filling and right ventricular contraction. Systemic venous congestion and elevated right atrial and systemic venous pressure are the results of right ventricular failure. High pulmonary vascular resistance newborns may develop functional pulmonary atresia (a result of ineffective right ventricular forward flow). Cyanosis is caused by a right-to-left shunting of blood through the patent oval foramen.

== Diagnosis ==
Myocardial biopsies can confirm the diagnosis, which is often established by imaging tests like cardiac magnetic resonance imaging or echocardiogram.

Right atrial and right ventricular dilatation is the cause of the cardiomegaly seen on the chest radiograph. The lung fields of newborns with functional pulmonary atresia and high pulmonary vascular resistance appear oligaemic.

Right ventricular and right atrial dilatation is evident on the electrocardiogram. One can observe an epsilon (ε) wave in the right praecordial leads.

An echocardiographic evaluation reveals a thin free wall of the right ventricle without any myocardium, reduced contractility and restricted ventricle filling, dilation of the right atrium, and normal tricuspid valve attachment to the right atrioventricular junction.

Global dyskinesia of a thin-walled right ventricle, absence of myocardium at the right ventricular free wall, lack of fibrofatty infiltration, normal tricuspid valve attachment to the right atrioventricular junction, and normal left ventricular myocardium are all indicative of cardiac magnetic resonance imaging findings.

Histopathologically, nonfunctioning fibroelastic tissue replaces the myocardial layer, giving the right ventricular free wall a parchment-like appearance.

Other anomalies that can result in RV dilatation, such as Ebstein anomaly, RV arrhythmogenic dysplasia, pulmonary atresia, and anomalous pulmonary venous return, are included in the differential diagnosis of Uhl anomaly.

== Treatment ==
When the pulmonary vascular resistance has become high and the newborn has severe cyanosis soon after birth, a brief intravenous prostaglandin E infusion is recommended. In most cases, diuretics are necessary for congestive right heart failure. Various surgical techniques have been used, such as: (1) one-and-a-half ventricular repair alongside partial right ventriculectomy and bidirectional Glenn shunt; (2) right ventricular exclusion alongside atrial septectomy as well as a bidirectional Glenn shunt (superior cavopulmonary anastomosis); and (3) cardiac transplantation.
