= Pacing and Clinical Electrophysiology =

- Discipline: Cardiology
- Language: English
- Edited by: Bradley P. Knight

Publication details
- History: 1978-present
- Publisher: Wiley-Blackwell
- Frequency: Monthly
- Impact factor: 1.156 (2015)

Standard abbreviations
- ISO 4: Pacing Clin. Electrophysiol.

Indexing
- CODEN: PPCEDP
- ISSN: 0147-8389 (print); 1540-8159 (web)
- OCLC no.: 03578626

Links
- Journal homepage

Pacing and Clinical Electrophysiology (PACE) is a peer-reviewed medical journal that publishes papers in cardiac pacing, clinical and basic cardiac electrophysiology, cardioversion-defibrillation, the electrical stimulation of other organs, cardiac assist, and, in general, the management of cardiac arrhythmias.

== Abstracting and indexing ==
The journal is abstracted and indexed in Current Contents, EMBASE, MEDLINE, Science Citation Index, and Scopus.
