= Samuel A. Levine =

American cardiologist

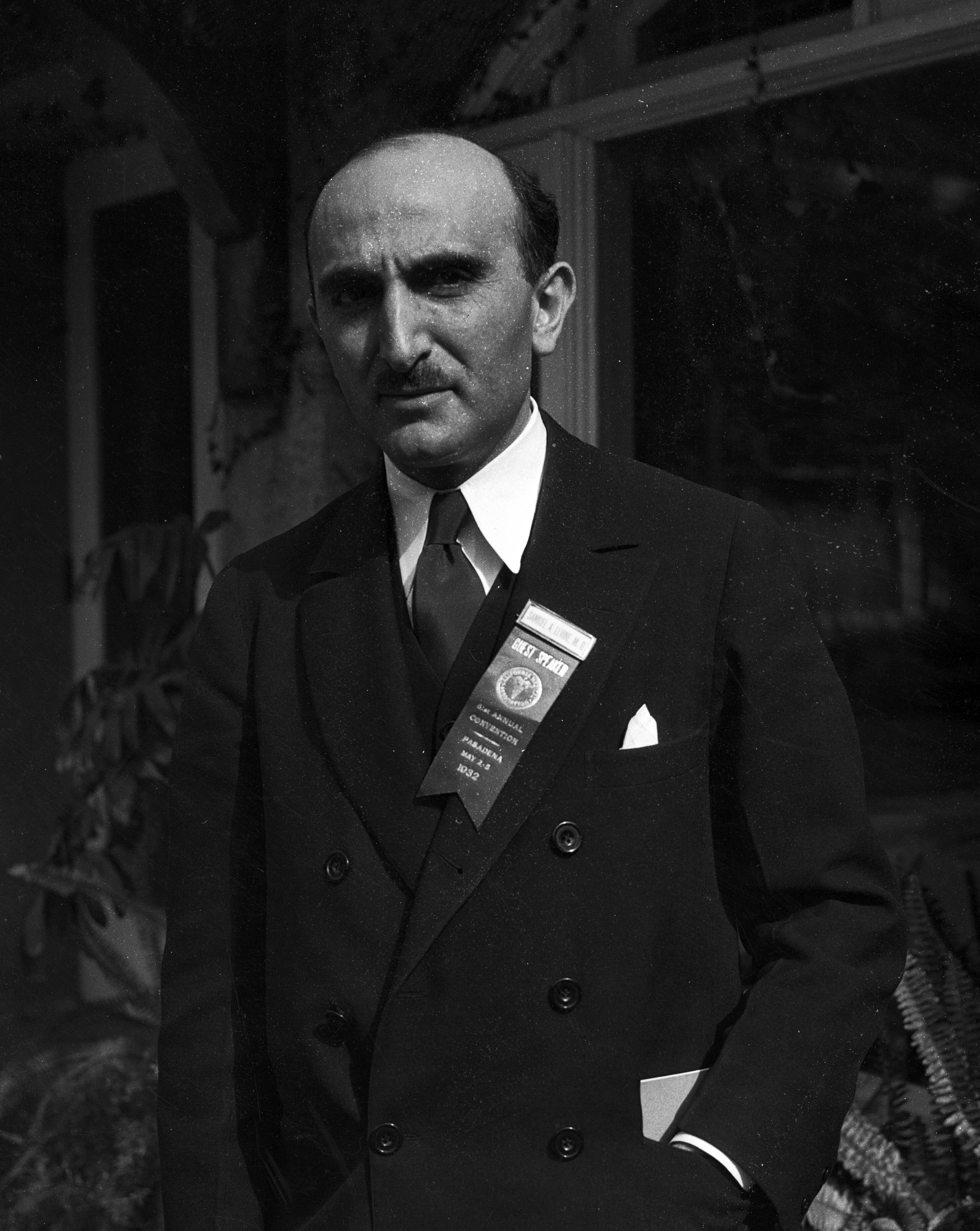
- Samuel A. Levine in 1932
- Born: January 1, 1891; Łomża, Poland
- Died: March 31, 1966 (aged 75); Newton, Massachusetts, US
- Occupation: Cardiologist
- Notable work: Treatment of coronary thrombosis

Samuel Albert Levine (January 1, 1891 – March 31, 1966) was an American cardiologist. The Levine scale, Levine's sign and Lown–Ganong–Levine syndrome are named after him. The Samuel Albert Levine Cardiac Unit at Brigham and Women's Hospital is named in his honor.

== Biography ==
Levine was born January 1, 1891, in Łomża, Poland, and was brought to the United States at age three. He graduated from Harvard University at the age of 20, and received a medical degree from Harvard in 1914. In his final year of medical school, he was chosen to do clinical research at Peter Bent Brigham Hospital in Boston. He served as an associate in medicine there and at the Rockefeller Institute.

In 1916, Levine was one of two young physicians recruited by the Harvard Infantile Paralysis Commission to cope with the caseload of that year's poliomyelitis epidemic. In August 1921, Levine gave advice in the case of Franklin D. Roosevelt's paralytic illness. He was the first to diagnose it as polio.

Levine was appointed assistant professor of medicine at Harvard in 1930, and physician at Peter Bent Brigham Hospital in 1940. He was clinical professor of medicine at Harvard from 1948 until his retirement in 1958. He was a consultant in cardiology at Brigham Hospital until his death, and affiliated with six other hospitals in the United States.

Levine was a pioneer in the treatment of coronary thrombosis. He was the second American physician to diagnose the condition, which he detailed in his book, Clinical Heart Disease (1936). He was a noted teacher and trainer of heart specialists including Bernard Lown, and also helped diagnose pernicious anemia.

Charles E. Merrill, founder of Merrill Lynch, endowed a chair of medicine in Levine's name at Harvard University in 1954. Named in his honor, the Samuel Albert Levine Cardiac Unit at Brigham and Women's Hospital opened in 1965.

Levine died March 31, 1966, in Newton, Massachusetts.
