= Irish Professional Photographers Association =

Non-profit association for professional photographers

The Irish Professional Photographers Association is a non-profit association for professional photographers. In spite of the name, membership is not limited to Ireland.

== Purpose ==
The Irish Professional Photographers Association (IPPA) is the network for qualified professional photographers throughout Ireland, and beyond.

== History ==
The IPPA was founded in 1949. As of 2019, it has over 350 members. It is a member of the Federation of European Professional Photographers and the World Council of Professional Photographers.

== Award qualifications ==
- Fellowship (F.I.P.P.A)
- Associateship (A.I.P.P.A)
- Licentiateship (L.I.P.P.A)

== Management Council ==
IPPA Management Council

President: Brendan Lyon, LIPPA

Regional Chairpersons North & West:Kelvin Gillmor, AIPPA South:Claire O'Rorke LIPPA East:Dermot Byrne, AIPPA

Council Members: Corin Bishop, AIPPA Michael McLaughlin, AIPPA John Ryan, AIPPA Peter Gordon, AIPPA Neil Warner, FIPPA Tom Doherty, FIPPA

== Charity work ==
The organisation runs an annual event, National Portrait Day (formerly Happy Faces Day)], in March/April each year. Since it first launched in 2006, National Portrait Day has raised almost €500,000 for its chosen charities. Each year, the IPPA have harnessed the goodwill and the photographic skills of its members for the benefit of Irish charities, and they have selected ISPCC as their charity of the year for 2014. You can have your picture taken at your local qualified IPPA photographer's studio or event location for a €25 donation.
