= International Journal of Cardiology =

- Discipline: Cardiology
- Language: English
- Edited by: Paolo G. Camici

Publication details
- History: 1981–present
- Publisher: Elsevier
- Frequency: Biweekly
- Impact factor: 4.164 (2020)

Standard abbreviations
- ISO 4: Int. J. Cardiol.

Indexing
- CODEN: IJCDD5
- ISSN: 0167-5273 (print); 1874-1754 (web)
- OCLC no.: 7833068

Links
- Journal homepage; Online access

The International Journal of Cardiology is a peer-reviewed medical journal that publishes research articles about the study and management of cardiac diseases. The journal is affiliated with the International Society for Adult Congenital Cardiac Disease.

== Abstracting and indexing ==
The journal is abstracted and indexed in MEDLINE, Science Citation Index, Current Contents, EMBASE, and Scopus. According to the Journal Citation Reports, the journal had a 2020 impact factor of 4.164.
