= Annals of Cardiac Anaesthesia =

- Discipline: Cardiology, anesthesiology
- Language: English

Publication details
- History: 1998–present
- Publisher: Medknow Publications on behalf of the Indian Association of Cardiovascular Thoracic Anaesthesiologists (India)
- Frequency: Quarterly
- Open access: Yes
- License: CC BY-NC-SA 4.0

Standard abbreviations
- ISO 4: Ann. Card. Anaesth.

Indexing
- ISSN: 0971-9784 (print); 0974-5181 (web)
- OCLC no.: 958677445

Links
- Journal homepage; Online access; Online archive

Annals of Cardiac Anaesthesia is a quarterly peer-reviewed open-access medical journal published by Medknow Publications on behalf of the Indian Association of Cardiovascular Thoracic Anaesthesiologists. It covers anaesthesia as related to cardiology and was established in 1998. The editor-in-chief is Prabhat Tewari (Sanjay Gandhi Postgraduate Institute of Medical Sciences), who succeeded Poonam Malhotra Kapoor (All India Institute of Medical Sciences, Delhi) in 2018. Kapoor caused controversy when she published an editorial touting the accomplishments of the journal. Although Kapoor published a correction, her successor accused her of having "glorified" her contributions, "undermining the efforts of the past editors" of the journal, and the editorial was subsequently retracted.

== Abstracting and indexing ==
The journal is abstracted and indexed in:

- EBSCO databases
- Emerging Sources Citation Index
- Excerpta Medica/Embase
- Index Medicus/MEDLINE/PubMed
- Scopus
