= Roseto effect =

Health-related phenomenon

The Roseto effect refers to a 1964 study done in mid-20th century Roseto, Pennsylvania, which claimed to have found lower incidence of heart disease there and attributed this, without evidence, to strong social bonds within a tight-knit immigrant community. Later studies failed to find evidence supporting this thesis and raised numerous methodological flaws with it, noting that Roseto's rate of deaths from heart attacks is comparable to Framingham, Massachusetts, the only other town from the era for which comparable data exists. A study also attributed any difference in heart disease to the town's diet, particularly moderate wine consumption.

The effect takes its name from Roseto, Pennsylvania. In 1961, the local Roseto doctor, Benjamin Falcone, told Stewart Wolf, then head of Medicine at the University of Oklahoma, that the community had a low rate of myocardial infarction among its Italian American residents, which sparked a series of investigations. Researchers later conducted a 50-year study comparing Roseto to nearby Bangor. As predicted, heart disease rates in Roseto rose and matched those of neighboring towns as residents gradually adopted more individualistic lifestyles and abandoned traditional social structures.

While the study did not examine diet in a rigorous fashion, it noted the impression that they consumed large amounts of fat.

In an interview with People magazine, Wolf said, "The community was very cohesive. There was no keeping up with the Joneses. Houses were very close together, and everyone lived more or less alike."

== Later research ==
More recent scholarship has revisited the Roseto Effect with more scrutiny. A 2024 peer-reviewed article attributed any difference in heart disease rates to moderate wine consumption.

== See also ==
- Blue zone
- Social determinants of health
- Community health
