= EP Europace =

- Discipline: Cardiology
- Language: English
- Edited by: Professor Gerhard Hindricks

Publication details
- Former names: Europace; European Journal of Pacing, Arrhythmias and Cardiac Electrophysiology
- History: 1999–present
- Publisher: Oxford University Press
- Frequency: Monthly
- Impact factor: 5.231 (2017)

Standard abbreviations
- ISO 4: EP Eur.

Indexing
- ISSN: 1532-2092 (print); 1099-5129 (web)
- OCLC no.: 61232412

Links
- Journal homepage; Online access; Online archive

EP Europace is a peer-reviewed medical journal published by Oxford University Press that publishes research articles about the study and management of cardiac arrhythmias, cardiac pacing, and cardiac cellular electrophysiology. It is 1 of 13 official journals of the European Society of Cardiology and is the official journal of the society's working groups on Cardiac Cellular Electrophysiology and e-Cardiology and of the European Heart Rhythm Association.

== Abstracting and indexing ==
The journal is abstracted and indexed in the following database:

- Current Contents/Clinical Medicine
- EMBASE
- MEDLINE/PubMed
- Pharmacoeconomics and Outcome News
- ProQuest
- Science Citation Index
- Scopus
- Standard Periodical Directory

According to the Journal Citation Reports, the journal has a 2017 impact factor of 5.231 and is ranked 25th out of 128 journals in the Cardiac and Cardiovascular Systems category.

== History ==
Europace was founded in 1999, with Richard Sutton as the founding Editor-in-chief. In 2007, A. John Camm became Editor-in-chief, who was succeeded by Gerhardt Hindricks in 2018.
