= Levine's sign =

Medical sign indicating angina

- Differential diagnosis: ischemic chest pain

Levine's sign is a clenched fist held over the chest to describe ischemic chest pain.

It is named for Samuel A. Levine (1891–1966), an influential American cardiologist, who first observed that many patients with chest pain made this same sign to describe their symptoms. This clenched fist signal may be seen in patients with acute coronary syndrome (myocardial infarction and angina pectoris).

A variant of this sign, which uses the entire palm instead of the clenched fist over the chest, is commonly known as the palm sign, and in Latin America it is widely referred to as Cossio's sign, Cossio–Levine sign or Fuchs–Levine sign. Argentine cardiologist Pedro Alurralde Cossio (1900–1986) who described the sign in 1934. Brazilian cardiologist Flávio Danni Fuchs (b. 1950) is also attributed as having described the sign.
