= Retinal vessel analysis =

Eye-examination method

Retinal vessel analysis is a non-invasive method to examine the small arteries and veins in the retina which allows to draw conclusions about the morphology and the function of small vessels elsewhere in the human body. Retinal vessel analysis is conducted mainly by ophthalmologists, cardiologists, neurologists and other medical specialities dealing with vascular diseases.

== Methods ==
There are two variants of retinal vessel analysis which are based on a special fundus camera, the Retinal Vessel Analyzer which was developed by Imedos, a medical engineering company in Jena, Germany. Basically, the Retinal Vessel Analyzer measures the diameters of small arteries (arterioles) and vein (venules) in the posterior segment of the eye. In static retinal vessel analysis this is a snapshot, in dynamic vessel analysis (DVA) a 12.5 Hz optoelectric flickering light induces a stimulation of a specific segment of the retina to which the vessels react by a change in their diameter which is quantified by the device. There are different protocols for conducting this examination; a typical procedure consists of applying flicker light three times over 20 seconds each, followed by 80 seconds relaxation time. Usually an area of 0.5–1 optic disc diameter from the optic disc is analyzed by using special analyzing software. The test is conducted after pharmacological dilation of the patient's pupils; apart from applying these eyedrops, the examination is completely non-invasive and non-demanding for the person undergoing retinal vessel analysis.

== Selected applications ==
Retinal vessel dynamics have the potential to serve as a tool for the assessment of risks in other organs since they are thought to reflect the general status of the microvasculature (i.e. the smallest vessels in the human body). The value of the examination with the Retinal Vessel Analyzer has been documented in a number of recent studies. There is growing evidence that in particular the dynamic vessel analysis is able to detect blood vessel damage - for instance as a consequence of aging or metabolic disease - in an early stage. Some examples:

Cardiology

In a recent publication, Andreas Flammer and his group at the Clinic of Cardiology at Zurich University performed retinal vessel analysis in 74 patients with compensated chronic heart failure, 74 patients with cardiovascular risk factors and 74 healthy controls. The primary endpoint, flicker-induced dilatation of retinal arterioles (FIDart), was significantly reduced in patients with chronic heart failure: 0.9% versus 2.3% in persons with risk factors and 3.6% in healthy individuals. The researchers concluded that retinal vessel analysis may represent a new and useful method to non-invasively monitor microvascular abnormalities in heart failure. In patients with diabetes mellitus, those suffering from cardiovascular disease showed significant differences in arterial maximum constriction after flicker light stimulation compared to patients with diabetes but without cardiovascular disease. This difference in reaction pattern and lack of arterial constriction in DM is thought to provide a suitable marker to monitor progression. In a cohort of 10,407 participants, analysing the retinal vessel caliber led to the reclassification of 21% of low-risk women to carrying an intermediate risk. Patients recovering from a myocardial infarction and included in an exercise based cardiac rehabilitation programme showed marked improvement in the retinal microvacular response.

Endocrinology

Hypercholesterolemia is associated with significant retinal microvascular dysfunction as evidenced in a study based on 67 patients with hypercholesterolemia without known cardiovascular disease by a reduction in flicker-induced dilatation of retinal arterioles.

Sports Medicine

Researchers from the Institute of Exercise and Health Sciences at the University of Basel demonstrated that cardiovascular fitness and body composition affect retinal vessel diameters which in turn give an indication of a person's cardiovascular health. One parameter evaluated in retinal vessel analysis, the mean arteriolar to venular diameter ratio (AVR), correlated with individual fitness and normalized in obese individuals after they underwent a training program and weight reduction. This was seen as an indication that regular exercise reverses the subclinical impairment of the retinal microvasculature and thus most likely of small vessels in other organs.

Neurology

In 2019, neurologists and ophthalmologists from Milan, Italy, demonstrated that arterial dilation was decreased in patients with manifest Alzheimer's disease and persons with mild cognitive impairment when performing dynamic vessel analysis. Since non-invasive and affordable methods for the early detection of Alzheimer's disease are scarce, the fact that alterations in vessel reaction could be detected in patients not yet clinically diagnosed was considered noteworthy. The study authors conclude that retinal vascular parameters may prove to be a useful biomarkers for these forms of dementia and to predict the disease progression.

Ophthalmology

In a study with 276 diabetic patients, a reduced retinal arteriolar and venular dilatory response to flickering light in DVA in eyes suffering from diabetic retinopathy was associated with an increased risk of progression.
