= QuantiaMD =

Defunct mobile and online community and collaboration platform for physicians

QuantiaMD is a defunct mobile and online community and collaboration platform for physicians which had over 200,000 registered members at its peak. QuantiaMD helped validated clinician members to stay informed by participating in short expert presentations, asking each other questions, and discussing how to new knowledge could be applied within their practice. QuantiaMD is a registered trademark of Quantia Inc, a privately held corporation headquartered in Waltham, Massachusetts. It is part of Aptus Health, whose clients include pharmaceutical companies.

== Platform and content ==
QuantiaMD's website and mobile app featured short, interactive presentations on various clinical and medical practice management topics. Presentations and cases are offered by some 500 QuantiaMD expert faculty members, which included physicians from academic institutions, group practices, and community medical centers. Presentations featured Q&A with community response built in and were available on all smartphones, tablets and computers.
