= Bruit =

Abnormal sound from turbulent arterial blood flow

- Other names: Vascular murmur
- Pronunciation: English: /ˈbruːt/, /ˈbruːi/
- Specialty: Cardiology

Bruit, also called vascular murmur, is the abnormal sound generated by turbulent flow of blood in an artery due to either an area of partial obstruction or a localized high rate of blood flow through an unobstructed artery.

The bruit may be heard ("auscultated") by securely placing the head of a stethoscope to the skin over the turbulent flow, and listening. Most bruits occur only in systole, so the bruit is intermittent and its frequency dependent on the heart rate. Anything increasing the blood flow velocity such as fever, anemia, hyperthyroidism, or physical exertion, can increase the amplitude of the bruit.

== Etymology ==
It is naturalized from the French word for "noise", although another notes that /ˈbruːi/ and /bruːˈiː/ are also common, and others give only /ˈbruːi/ for the cardiac sense.

== Associated terms ==
=== Describing location of a partial obstruction ===
- Peripheral vascular disease; femoral artery stenosis
- Renal artery stenosis
- Stroke, carotid artery stenosis
- Aortic aneurysm
- Tinnitus – a symptom which may be caused by a cranial artery bruit
- Arteriovenous malformation
- Coarctation of the aorta
- Hepatocellular carcinoma
- Alcoholic hepatitis

=== Describing the mechanism of a partial obstruction ===
- Atherosclerosis (atheroma or plaque) (cholesterol deposition in artery wall)
- Median arcuate ligament syndrome, celiac artery stenosis – external compression

=== Describing location of localized high blood flow ===
- Arteriovenous (AV) fistula – pathologic or surgically created
- Graves' disease, goitre
- Paget's disease

=== Unclassified ===
- Polymyalgia rheumatica
- Giant cell arteritis
- Fibromuscular dysplasia
- IgG4-related disease

== See also ==
- Carotid bruit
- Souffle
