= Wallace Brigden =

British cardiologist

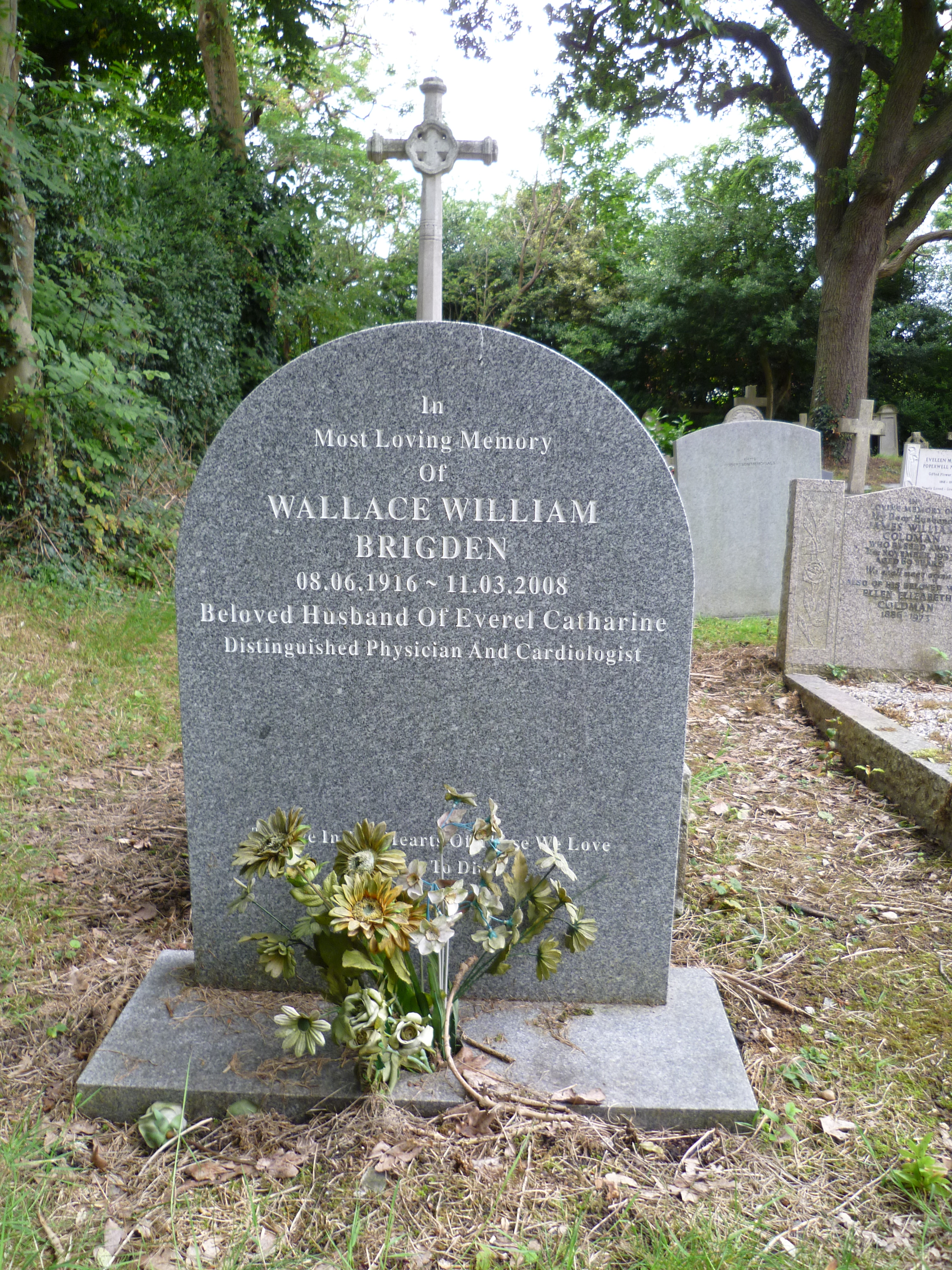
Wallace Brigden's grave at St Andrew's church, Totteridge.

Wallace William Brigden (8 June 1916 – 11 March 2008) was a British cardiologist who pioneered new treatments for heart disease after the Second World War.

He is buried at St Andrew's church, Totteridge, London.
