= Cardiology in Review =

- Discipline: Cardiology, vascular diseases
- Language: English
- Edited by: William H. Frishman, Patrick T. O'Gara

Publication details
- History: 1993-present
- Publisher: Lippincott Williams & Wilkins
- Frequency: Bimonthly
- Open access: Hybrid
- Impact factor: 3.075 (2012)

Standard abbreviations
- ISO 4: Cardiol. Rev.

Indexing
- CODEN: CRVIE4
- ISSN: 1061-5377 (print); 1538-4683 (web)
- OCLC no.: 48798132

Links
- Journal homepage; Online access; Online archive

Cardiology in Review is a bimonthly peer-reviewed medical journal covering cardiology. It was established in 2011 and is published by Lippincott Williams & Wilkins. The editors-in-chief are William H. Frishman (New York Medical College) and Patrick T. O'Gara (Brigham & Women's Hospital).

== Aims and scope ==
The aim of the journal is to publish comprehensive, and authoritative reviews for practicing clinicians. Topical coverage includes diagnosis, clinical courses, prevention, and treatment of cardiovascular disorders. Publishing formats are invited reviews, unsolicited critiques, and unsolicited comprehensive analysis, all pertaining to cardiovascular disease and treatment.

== Abstracting and indexing ==
The journal is abstracted and indexed in:

- Science Citation Index Expanded
- Current Contents/Clinical Medicine
- MEDLINE - PubMed, and Index medicus
- EMBASE
- Scopus

== Notable articles ==
- P. J., Casterella; Teirstein, P. S. (1999). "Prevention of Coronary Restenosis". Cardiology in Review. 7 (4): 219–231. doi:10.1097/00045415-199907000-00014. PMID 10423674.
- Basso, C; Corrado, D; Thiene, G (1999). "Cardiovascular causes of sudden death in young individuals including athletes". Cardiology in Review. 7 (3): 127–35. doi:10.1097/00045415-199905000-00009. PMID 10423663.
- Chiang, CE (2004). "Congenital and acquired long QT syndrome. Current concepts and management". Cardiology in Review. 12 (4): 222–34. doi:10.1097/01.crd.0000123842.42287.cf. PMID 15191637. S2CID 1964867.
- Park, D; Huang, T; Frishman, WH (2005). "Phytoestrogens as cardioprotective agents". Cardiology in Review. 13 (1): 13–7. doi:10.1097/01.crd.0000126084.68791.32. PMID 15596022. S2CID 24179234.
