= Clinical and Experimental Hypertension =

- Discipline: Hypertension
- Language: English
- Edited by: Mustafa F. Lokhandwala

Publication details
- History: 1978-present
- Publisher: Taylor & Francis
- Frequency: 8/year
- Impact factor: 1.234 (2014)

Standard abbreviations
- ISO 4: Clin. Exp. Hypertens.

Indexing
- ISSN: 1064-1963 (print); 1525-6006 (web)
- OCLC no.: 41602417

Links
- Journal homepage; Online access; Online archive

Clinical and Experimental Hypertension is a peer-reviewed medical journal that covers all aspects of human and animal hypertension. It was established in 1978 and is published by Taylor & Francis. The editor-in-chief is Mustafa F. Lokhandwala (University of Houston). According to the Journal Citation Reports, the journal has a 2014 impact factor of 1.234.
