= Fasegraphy =

Method for processing electrocardiograms

Fasegraphy is a method for processing electrocardiograms (ECG) developed by the International Scientific and Educational Center for Information Technologies and Systems of the National Academy of Sciences of Ukraine and the Ministry of Education and Science of Ukraine.

The main feature of the fasegraphy method is the transition from the scalar ECG-signal z(t) in any of the leads to its mapping on the phase plane with the coordinates z(t), dz/dt, where dz/dt is the rate of change in the heart electrical activity. It fundamentally distinguishes fasegraphy from other similar approaches, based on the mapping of the signal on the plane with the coordinates z(t), z(t-tau), where tau is the time delay.

Fasegraphy allows expanding the system of ECG diagnostic features, based on the evaluation of the speed characteristics of the process, and thereby increasing the sensitivity and specificity of ECG-diagnostics. Fasegraphy allows determining the initial features of changes in the cardiac muscle, even on a single-channel ECG, which are underestimated in traditional ECG diagnostics.

The method was recommended by the Ministry of Health of Ukraine for conducting screening.
