= Carotid bruit =

- Carotid bruit in a gentleman with a 70% stenosis of his left carotid artery.
- Specialty: Vascular surgery

A carotid bruit is a vascular murmur sound (bruit) heard over the carotid artery area on auscultation during systole.

== Associated conditions ==
It may occur as the result of carotid artery stenosis (though some disagree); however, most carotid bruits, particularly those found in younger or asymptomatic patients, are not related to any disease and are termed "innocent carotid bruits".

Many carotid bruits are discovered incidentally in an otherwise asymptomatic patient. The presence of a carotid bruit alone does not necessarily indicate the presence of stenosis, and the physical examination cannot be used to estimate the degree of stenosis, if present; therefore, any bruit must be evaluated by ultrasound or imaging.

== Pronunciation and terminology ==
Bruit is traditionally pronounced broot, rhyming with fruit, although the etymologically accurate pronunciation bru´e or bru-e´ is common in North American medical parlance. In addition, while bruit and murmur are technically synonymous, the term bruit is generally reserved for arterial sounds in North America.
