= Levine scale =

Scoring system for heart murmurs

In cardiac physiology, the Levine grading scale is a numeric scoring system to characterize the intensity or the loudness of a heart murmur. The eponym is from researcher Samuel A. Levine who studied the significance of systolic heart murmurs. The grading gives a number to the intensity from 1 to 6: The palpable murmur is known as thrill, which can be felt on grade 4 or higher.

1. The murmur is only audible on listening carefully for some time.
2. The murmur is faint but immediately audible on placing the stethoscope on the chest.
3. A loud murmur readily audible but with no thrill.
4. A loud murmur with a thrill.
5. A loud murmur with a thrill. The murmur is so loud that it is audible with only the rim of the stethoscope touching the chest.
6. A loud murmur with a thrill. The murmur is audible with the stethoscope not touching the chest but lifted just off it.

The Levine scaling system persists as the gold standard for grading heart murmur intensity. It provides accuracy, consistency, and interrater agreement which are essential for diagnostic purposes, particularly to distinguish innocent from pathological murmurs. Louder murmurs (grade ≥3) are more likely believed to represent cardiac defects that tend to have hemodynamic consequences.

The Levine scale is usually written down as a fraction of 6 and in Roman numerals, as in a scale of II/VI.
