= IPPA =

- Synonyms: inspection, palpation, percussion, and auscultation

IPPA is a physical examination with four key steps: inspection, palpation, percussion, and auscultation.

Although the steps are consistent across organ systems, the order may vary. Notably, for the abdominal exam, auscultation is performed before palpation, because the act of palpation could change what was auscultated.
