= Jugular venous pressure =

Blood pressure in a vein of the neck

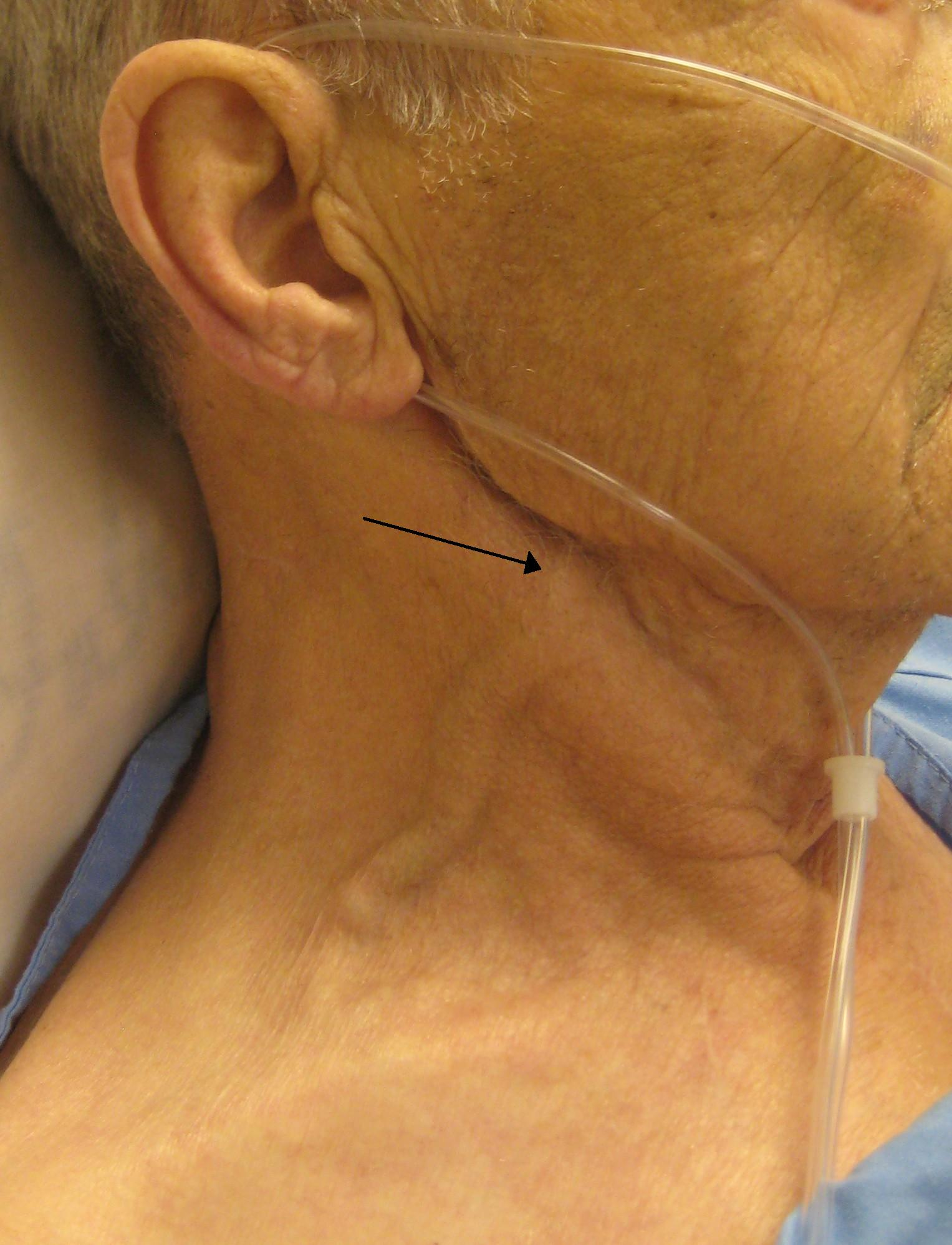
A man with congestive heart failure and marked jugular venous distention. External jugular vein marked by an arrow; however, JVP is not measured by looking at the external jugular vein even but is instead measured by pulsations of the skin from the internal jugular vein, which is not visible in this image.

The jugular venous pressure (JVP, sometimes referred to as jugular venous pulse) is the indirectly observed pressure over the venous system via visualization of the internal jugular vein. It can be useful in the differentiation of different forms of heart and lung disease. Classically three upward deflections and two downward deflections have been described.

- The upward deflections are the "a" (atrial contraction), "c" (ventricular contraction and resulting bulging of tricuspid into the right atrium during isovolumetric systole) and "v" (venous filling).
- The downward deflections of the wave are the "x" descent (the atrium relaxes and the tricuspid valve moves downward) and the "y" descent (filling of ventricle after tricuspid opening).

== Method ==
=== Visualization ===
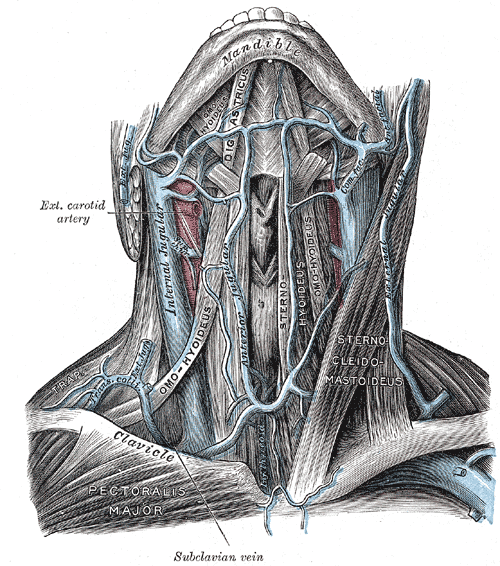
The veins of the neck, viewed from in front.

The patient is positioned at a 45° incline. The head is gently turned to the left, and the right external jugular vein should be identified which may be pulsatile and the filling level noted. If the external jugular vein is pulsatile it is a reliable indicator of jugular venous pressure, however if it is not pulsatile it may contain a valve or be kinked, in which case it will not provide an accurate measure of jugular venous pressure. The JVP represents right atrial pressure, which in a healthy person should be between 2 – 8 cm $\ce{H2O}$. The JVP is measured from the level of the right atrium, however as it is impractical to determine the level of the right atrium, the position of the sternal angle is used as a surrogate, which is assumed to be 4 cm above the level of the right atrium. Hence the filling level of the jugular vein should be no more than 4 centimetres above the vertical height of the sternal angle. This may not be accurate in individuals at extremes of body habitus. A pen-light can aid in discerning the jugular filling level by providing tangential light.

The JVP is easiest to observe if one looks along the surface of the sternocleidomastoid muscle, as it is easier to appreciate the subtle movement relative to the neck when looking from the side (as opposed to looking at the surface at a 90-degree angle). The internal jugular vein is typically not able to be visualised directly, rather the pulsations that are transmitted through to the sternocleidomastoid muscle are. Both the left and right jugular veins can be used to examine JVP, however the right side is preferably used due to having a more direct connection to the right atrium. It is helpful to turn the head gently to one side for better exposure, but avoid turning the neck excessively as it will lead to tension in the sternocleidomastoid muscle and skin making it difficult to visualise the pulsations.

If the JVP is not visible with the patient at 45°, the JVP may be either be severely elevated to beyond the level of the ear, in which case the patient should be sat up to 90° and re-examined. Alternatively, the JVP may be below the level of the clavicle, in which case the patient can be laid flat and re-examined. Finally, it may be difficult to appreciate the JVP in a small number of patients due to anatomy and body habitus.

Pulses in the JVP are rather hard to observe, but trained cardiologists do try to discern these as signs of the state of the right heart.

=== Differentiation from the carotid pulse ===
The JVP and carotid pulse can be differentiated several ways:

- multiphasic – the JVP is usually biphasic and "beats" twice (in quick succession) in the cardiac cycle. In other words, there are two waves in the JVP for each contraction-relaxation cycle by the heart. The first beat represents that atrial contraction (termed a) and second beat represents venous filling of the right atrium against a closed tricuspid valve (termed v). The 'c' wave is rarely visible and is typically difficult to discern from the 'a' wave. These wave forms may be altered by certain medical conditions, for example in atrial fibrilation the 'a' wave may be lost. The carotid artery will only have one beat in the cardiac cycle.
- non-palpable – the JVP cannot be palpated. If one feels a pulse in the neck, it is generally the common carotid artery.
- occludable – the JVP can be stopped by occluding the internal jugular vein by lightly pressing against the neck. It will fill from above.
- timing - this can be better appreciated when performed whilst ascultating the praecordium at the same time. The 'a' wave occurs prior to S1, the 'c' wave occurs at S1, the 'v' wave occurs at S2. Meanwhile the carotid pulse occurs between S1 and S2, simultaneously with the 'x' descent - i.e. the JVP and the carotid pulse are moving in the opposite direction.
- morphology - the JVP has a more gentle slope and the most prominent elements are the 'x' and 'y' descents which are both downstrokes. On the other hand the carotid has a brisk upstroke. This may be difficult to appreciate in the context of certain conditions, e.g. in tricuspid regurgitation, where giant C-V waves may appear similar to carotid pulsations, however in tricuspid regurgitation the giant C-V waves should appear to shoot up the neck, whilst the carotid pulsation is transmitted simultaneously throughout the neck.
- location - the JVP is located posteriorly to the carotid pulse, although this may not always be reliable as the carotid pulse may be transmitted through the SCM muscle.
- positioning - the position of the JVP will move up or down the neck depending on the angle of the patient, whilst the carotid pulse will remain in the same location.
- respiration - the JVP will fall with inspiration and rise with expiration, the position of the carotid will remain the same.

=== JVP waveform ===
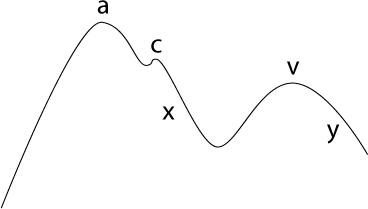
A JVP waveform

The jugular venous pulsation has a multiphasic waveform and will typically appear as biphasic on examination.

- The a wave corresponds to right atrial contraction and ends synchronously with the carotid artery pulse. The peak of the 'a' wave demarcates the end of atrial systole.
- The x descent follows the 'a' wave and corresponds to atrial relaxation and rapid atrial filling due to low pressure.
- The c wave corresponds to right ventricular contraction causing the closed tricuspid valve to bulge towards the right atrium during RV isovolumetric contraction. The 'c' wave is rarely discernible from the 'a' wave as it is separated from the 'a' wave by 120ms which corresponds to the PR interval. It occurs simultaneously with S1.
- The 'x' descent follows the 'c' wave and occurs as a result of the right ventricle pulling the tricuspid valve downward during ventricular systole (ventricular ejection/atrial relaxation). (As stroke volume is ejected, the ventricle takes up less space in the pericardium, allowing relaxed atrium to enlarge). The x' (x prime) descent can be used as a measure of right ventricle contractility.
- The v wave corresponds to venous filling when the tricuspid valve is closed and venous pressure increases from venous return – this occurs during and following the carotid pulse. It occurs simultaneously with S2.
- The y descent corresponds to the rapid emptying of the atrium into the ventricle following the opening of the tricuspid valve.

=== Quantification ===
A classical method for quantifying the JVP was described by Borst & Molhuysen in 1952. It has since been modified in various ways. A venous arch may be used to measure the JVP more accurately.

=== Moodley's sign ===
This sign is used to determine which waveform you are viewing. Feel the radial pulse while simultaneously watching the JVP. The waveform that is seen immediately after the arterial pulsation is felt is the 'v wave' of the JVP.

=== Abdominojugular test ===
The term hepatojugular reflux was previously used, as it was thought that compression of the liver resulted in "reflux" of blood out of the hepatic sinusoids into the inferior vena cava, thereby elevating right atrial pressure and visualized as jugular venous distention. The exact physiologic mechanism of jugular venous distention with a positive test is much more complex and the commonly accepted term is now abdominojugular test.

The abdominojugular test was shown to correlate best with the pulmonary arterial wedge pressure. Furthermore, patients with a positive response had lower left ventricular ejection fractions and stroke volumes, higher left ventricular filling pressure, higher mean pulmonary arterial, and higher right atrial pressures.

The abdominojugular test, when done in a standardized fashion, correlates best with the pulmonary arterial wedge pressure, and therefore, is probably a reflection of an increased central blood volume. In the absence of isolated right ventricular failure, seen in some patients with right ventricular infarction, a positive abdominojugular test suggests a pulmonary artery wedge pressure of 15 mm Hg or greater.

== Interpretation ==
An elevated JVP is the classic sign of venous hypertension (e.g. right-sided heart failure). JVP elevation can be visualized as jugular venous distension, whereby the JVP is visualized at a level of the neck that is higher than normal. The jugular venous pressure is often used to assess the central venous pressure in the absence of invasive measurements (e.g. with a central venous catheter, which is a tube inserted in the neck veins). A 1996 systematic review concluded that a high jugular venous pressure makes a high central venous pressure more likely, but does not significantly help confirm a low central venous pressure. The study also found that agreement between doctors on the jugular venous pressure can be poor, calling into question its reliability as a clinical decision-making tool. Similarly, a 2016 study examined the use of JVP measurements by clinical examination in the evaluation of central venous pressure in patients with heart failure. This study found that JVP examination was not consistent with actual central venous pressures, such that it was unreliable both for ruling in and ruling out heart failure. JVP measurement was especially unreliable in patients with high body fat. Additionally, it was noted that clinicians seemed to "extrapolate" JVP measurements from other, more easily examinable findings (like lung auscultation, body weight, heart rate, brachial blood pressure, and chest radiography findings).

The paradoxical increase of the JVP with inspiration (instead of the expected decrease) is referred to as the Kussmaul sign, and indicates impaired filling of the right ventricle. The differential diagnosis of Kussmaul's sign includes constrictive pericarditis, restrictive cardiomyopathy, pericardial effusion, and severe right-sided heart failure.

Certain wave form abnormalities, include cannon a-waves, or increased amplitude 'a' waves, are associated with AV dissociation (third degree heart block), when the atrium is contracting against a closed tricuspid valve, or even in ventricular tachycardia. Another abnormality, "c-v waves", can be a sign of tricuspid regurgitation. The absence of 'a' waves may be seen in atrial fibrillation.

An exaggerated "y" wave or diastolic collapse of the neck veins from constrictive pericarditis is referred to as Friedreich's sign.

Abnormal JVP waveforms
Abnormality	Causes
Raised JVP, normal waveform	Bradycardia; Fluid overload; Heart failure
Raised JVP, absent pulsation	Superior vena cava syndrome
Large 'a' wave (increased atrial contraction pressure)	Tricuspid stenosis; Right heart failure; Pulmonary hypertension
Cannon 'a' wave (atria contracting against closed tricuspid valve)	Atrial flutter - this will appear as flutter waves (250-300bpm); Premature atrial rhythm (or tachycardia); Third degree heart block; Ventricular ectopics; Ventricular tachycardia; Ventricular paced rhythmn
Absent 'a' wave (no unifocal atrial depolarisation)	Atrial fibrillation
Large 'v' wave	Mild tricuspid regurgitation
Absent 'x' descent	Moderate tricuspid regurgitation
Giant c–v wave	Severe tricuspid regurgitation
Prominent 'x' descent	Cardiac tamponade
Slow 'y' descent	Tricuspid stenosis; Cardiac tamponade
Prominent & deep 'y' descent	Constrictive pericarditis
Parodoxical JVP (Kussmaul's sign: JVP rises with inspiration, drops with expiration)	Pericardial effusion; Constrictive pericarditis; Pericardial tamponade

== See also ==
- Wiggers diagram
