= Kussmaul's sign =

- Specialty: Cardiology

Kussmaul's sign is a paradoxical rise in jugular venous pressure (JVP) on inspiration, or a failure in the appropriate fall of the JVP with inspiration. It can be seen in some forms of heart disease and is usually indicative of limited right ventricular filling due to right heart dysfunction.

== Pathophysiology ==
Ordinarily the JVP falls with inspiration due to reduced pressure in the expanding thoracic cavity and the increased volume afforded to right ventricular expansion during diastole. Kussmaul sign suggests impaired filling of the right ventricle due to a poorly compliant myocardium or pericardium. This impaired filling causes the increased blood flow to back up into the venous system, causing the jugular vein distention (JVD) and is seen clinically in the internal jugular veins becoming more readily visible.

== Causes ==
The differential diagnoses of Kussmaul's sign includes constrictive pericarditis, restrictive cardiomyopathy, pericardial effusion, and severe right-sided heart failure.

With cardiac tamponade, jugular veins are distended and typically show a prominent x descent and an absent y descent as opposed to patients with constrictive pericarditis (prominent x and y descent); see Beck's triad.

Other possible causes of Kussmaul's sign include:

- Right ventricular infarction - low ventricular compliance
- Cardiac tumours
- Tricuspid stenosis
- Pulmonary embolism

== History ==
Kussmaul's sign is named after the German doctor who first described it, Adolph Kussmaul (1822–1902). He is also credited with describing Kussmaul breathing.

== See also ==
- Pulsus paradoxus
