= Max Fürbringer =

German anatomist and ornithologist (1846–1920)

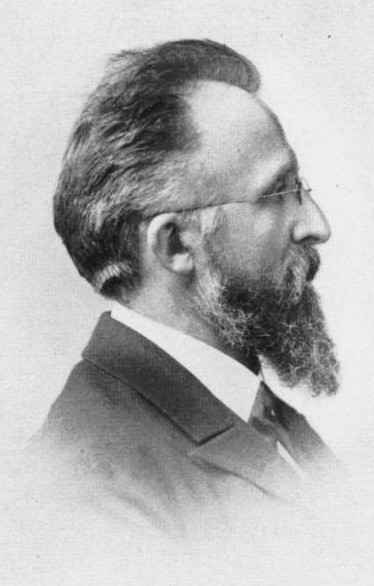
Portrait in 1905

Max Carl Anton Fürbringer (January 30, 1846 – March 6, 1920) was a German anatomist, known for his anatomical investigations of vertebrates and especially for his studies in ornithology on avian morphology and classification. He was responsible for the first major phylogenetic ordering of bird groups based on a large scale study on a combination of skeletal, morphological and anatomical characteristics.

== Biography ==
Max was the first son of Hermine and Karl Fürbringer. Although he was born in Wittenberg, his father's government employment involved travel and he was raised by relatives in Gera. Max was taught and influenced by Karl Theodor Liebe, a bird enthusiast who kept many kinds of birds. Max spent his early childhood collecting coins, butterflies, bees, mosses and ferns. Max's brother Paul would later become an eminent physicist. Max studied at the universities of Berlin and Jena, where he was a student of Carl Gegenbaur. Fürbringer would be one of Gegenbaur's most ardent disciples and supporters. One of Fürbringer teachers was Ernst Haeckel about whom he wrote glowingly: "He stepped into the auditorium, not with the measured step of the professor, but with the triumphant charging-along of an Apollonian youth, hurrying toward the cathedral, a tall, slender, impressive form; ... golden, flying locks, large, blue, flashing eyes—probably the most beautiful man that I had ever seen, and it seemed to me as if the room, which had already been bright, became noticeably brighter..." He obtained his doctorate with a thesis on the muscles and bones of dinosaurs. He later worked as a prosector under Gegenbaur at the University of Heidelberg, followed by professorships in Amsterdam, Jena (from 1888) and Heidelberg (from 1901). While in Jena he was elected to honorary membership of the Manchester Literary and Philosophical Society in 1892.

In 1901 he replaced Gegenbaur at Heidelberg as professor and stayed on until 1912 when his student (and later son-in-law) Hermann Braus took over. He then served as an außerordentliche (=extraordinary) professor at the University of Marburg.

In 1888 Fürbringer published a monumental two volume work on the systematics of birds groups. The first volume was on the forelimbs and shoulder girdle of vertebrates while the second examined the characters and systematics of bird groups. One of the ideas that he used was that the connection of the nerve to a muscle tends to be conserved with evolution. He made use of 51 anatomical and morphological characters and compared every pair of bird group and deduced an evolutionary tree of all the extant and extinct bird groups. His evolutionary tree branched in three dimensions which he represented by means of side and cross-sectional views. This representation was probably influenced by the work of Adolf Engler on plants. This was a seminal work in bird systematics which underwent modifications by Hans Gadow and others to become a definitive basis for subsequent work on the avian evolutionary tree well until the arrival of molecular techniques.

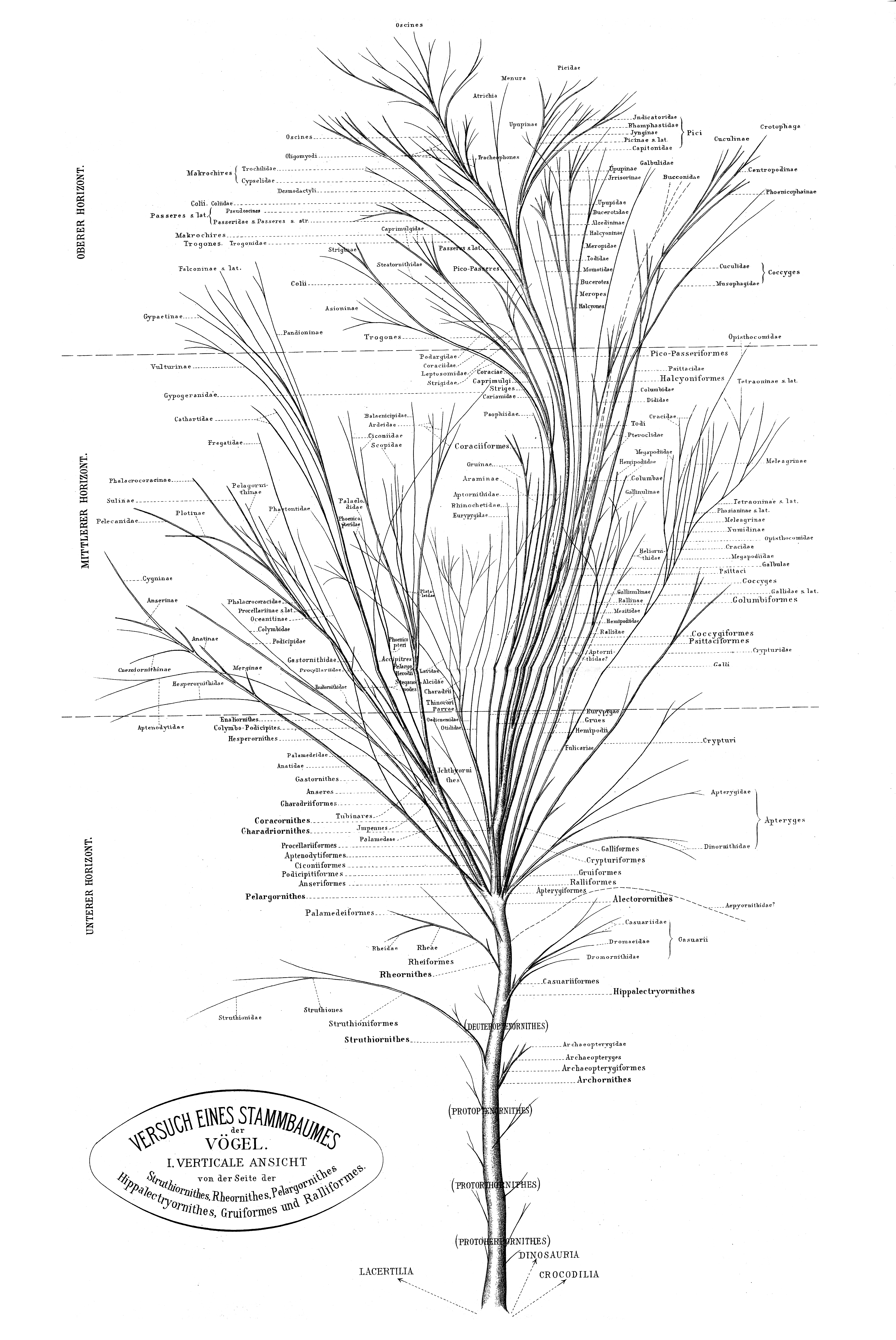
Front view of tree

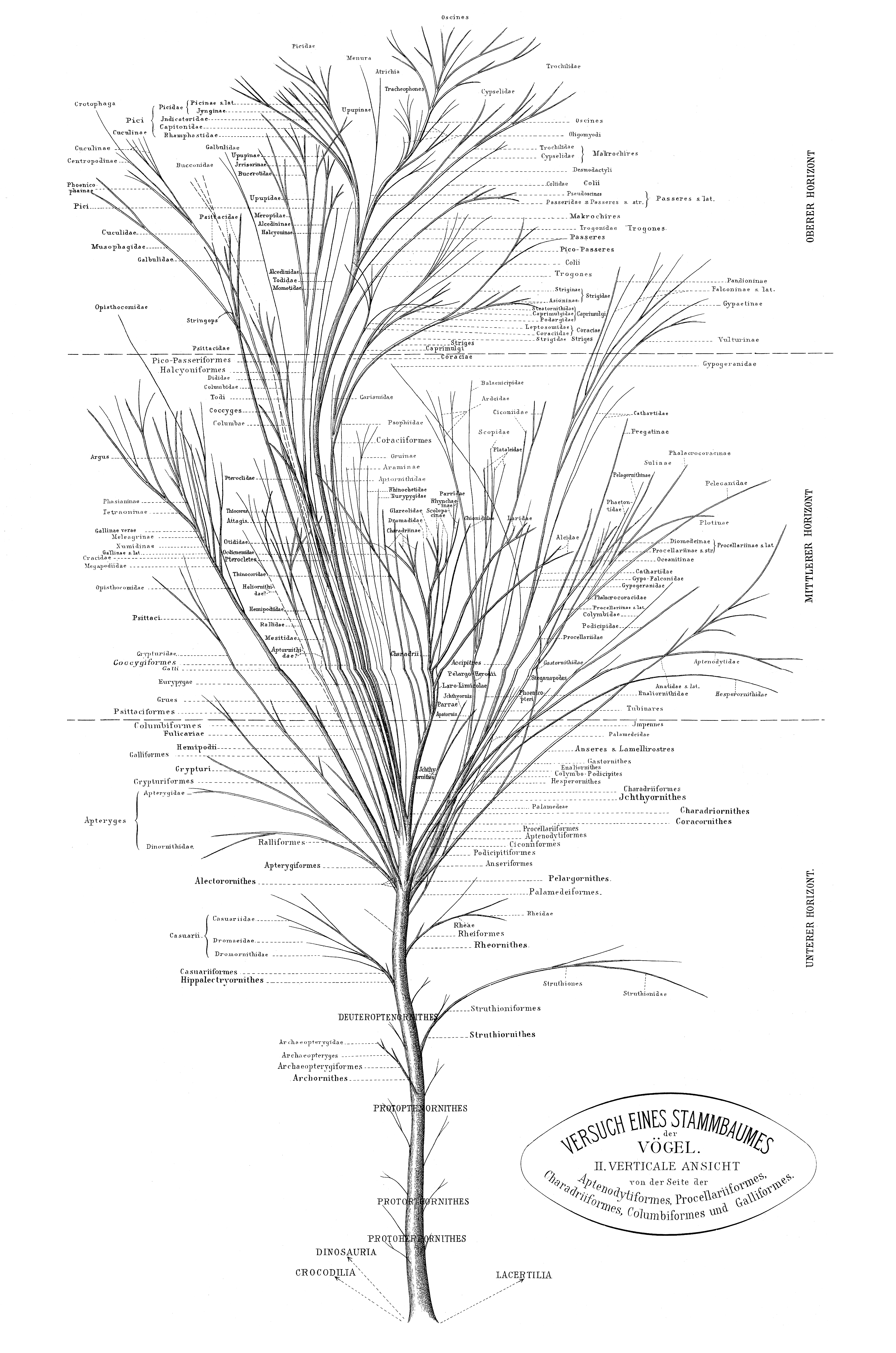
Rear view of tree

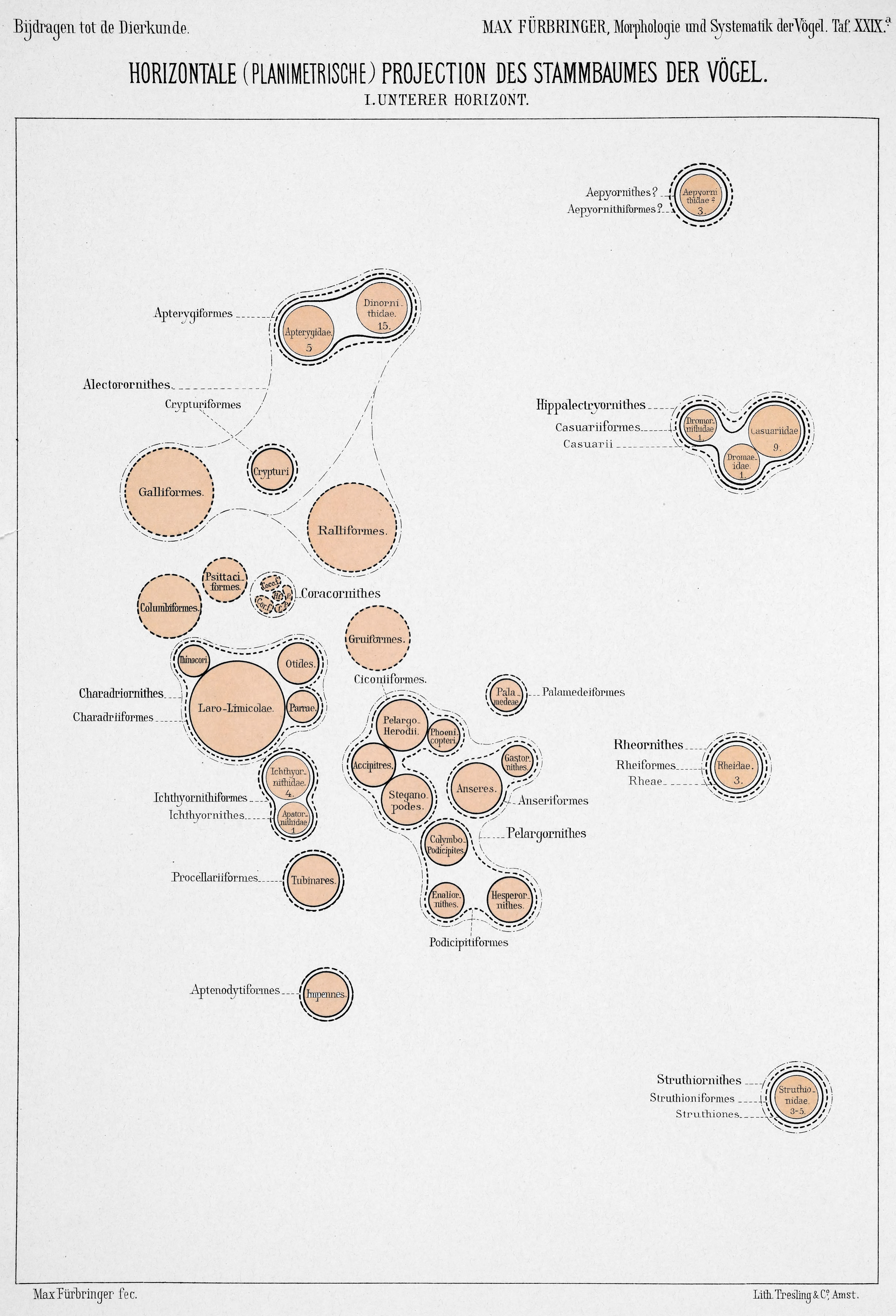
Cross section, lower

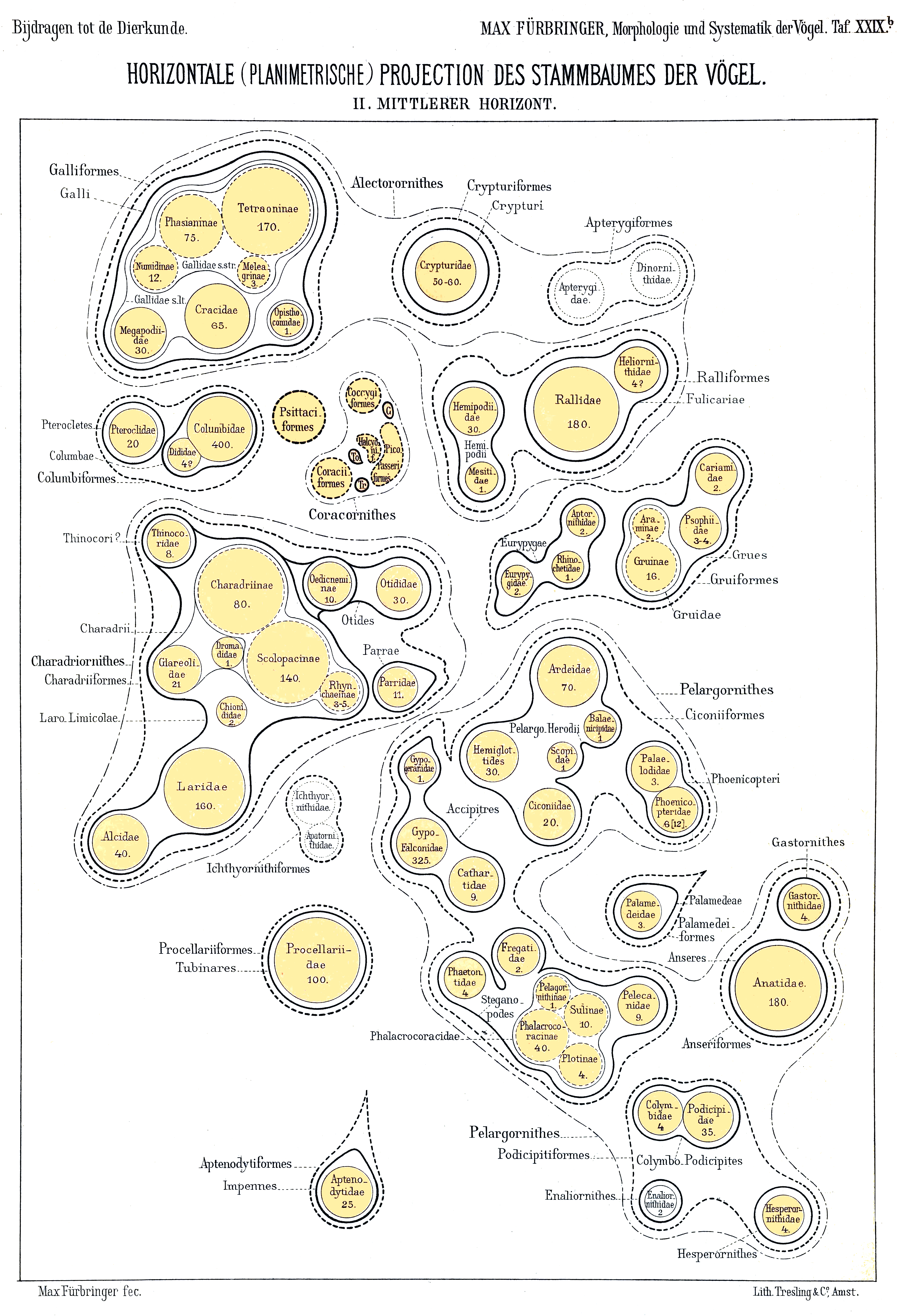
Cross section, middle

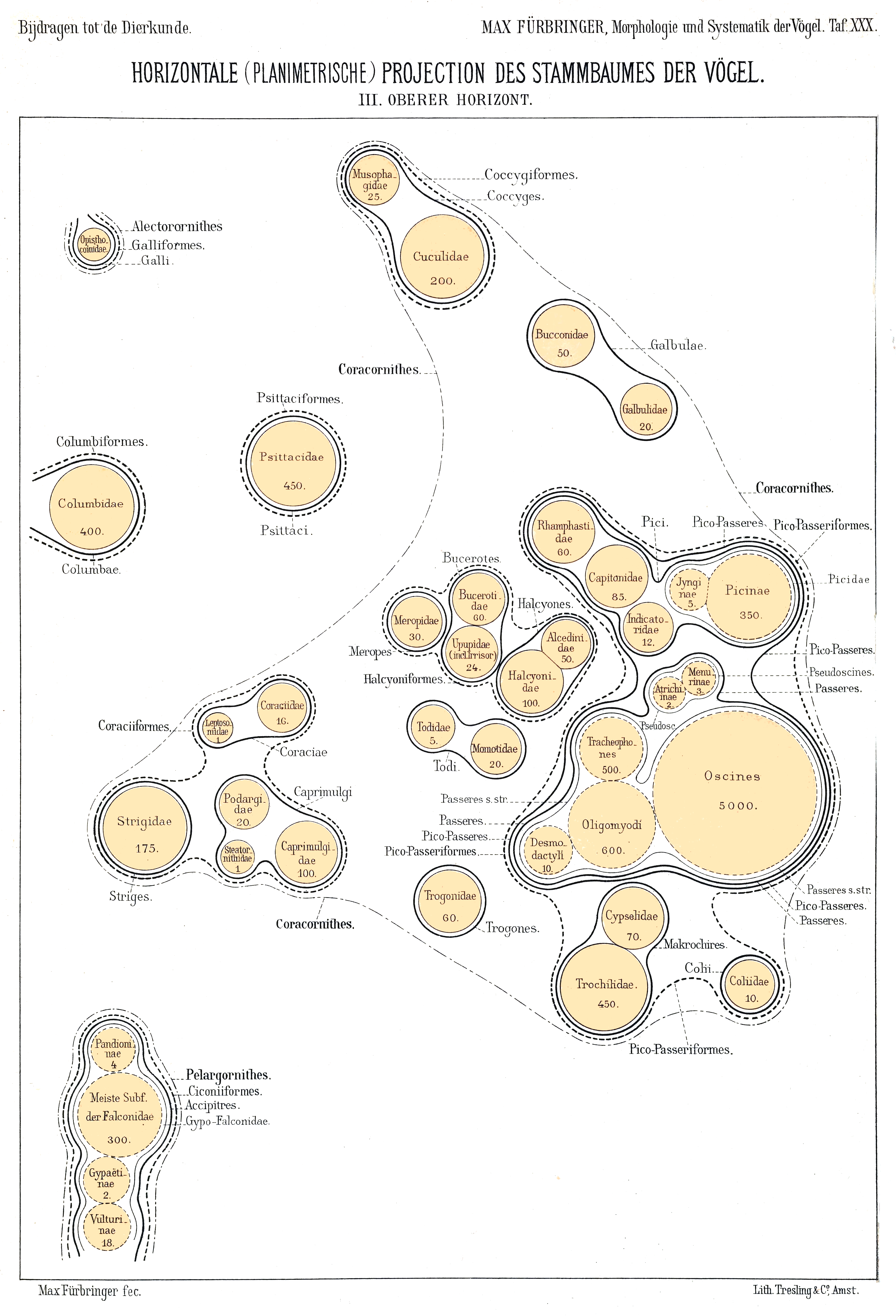
Cross section, upper

As a defender of Gegenbaur, Fürbringer went against Carl Rabl in 1901. This long drawn conflict relating to the archipterygium or how the fin and the limb were related based on conflicting evidence from anatomy and embryology descended into polemical attacks on each other.

== Selected writings ==
- Die Knochen und Muskeln der Extremitäten bei den schlangenähnlichen Saurien ("The bones and muscles of the extremities in the snake-like lizards"), 1870.
- Zur Entwickelung der Amphibienniere ("The development of amphibian kidneys"), 1877.
- Vergleichende Anatomie und Entwicklungsgeschichte der Excretionsorgane der Vertebraten ("Comparative anatomy and history of development of the excretion organs of the vertebrates"), 1878.
- Untersuchungen zur Morphologie und Systematik der Vögel ("Researches on the morphology and systematics of the bird"), 1888. (in two volumes)
- Über die spino-occipitalen Nerven der Salachier und Holocephalen und ihre vergleichende Morphologie, 1897.
- Beitrag zur Systematik und Genealogie der Reptilien ("Contribution to the systematics and genealogy of the reptiles"), 1900.
- Zur vergleichenden Anatomie des Brustschulterapparates und der Schultermuskeln ("Comparative anatomy of the breast-shoulder apparatus and the shoulder muscles"), volumes 4 and 5, 1900–1902.
- Morphologische Streitfragen ("Controversial questions in morphology"), 1902.
- Abstammung der Säugetiere ("Mammal ancestry"), 1905.
