= Friedrich Schultze =

German neurologist

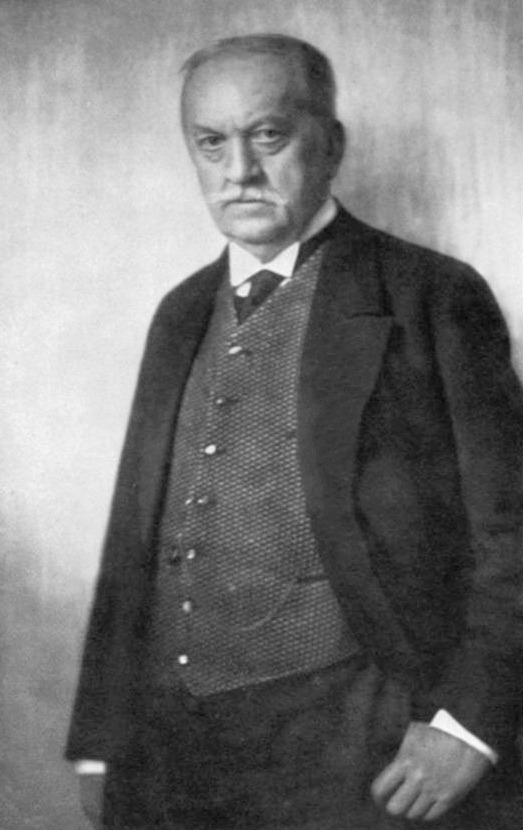
- Born: August 12, 1848; Rathenow, Brandenburg, Germany
- Died: 14 October 1934 (aged 86); Bonn
- Scientific career
- Fields: Neurology

Friedrich Schultze (12 August 1848 – 14 October 1934) was a German neurologist and native of Rathenow, Brandenburg. He is known for being the founder of child neurology.

In 1871 he earned his doctorate at Heidelberg, and afterwards spent several years as an assistant to pathologist Nikolaus Friedreich (1825–1882). In 1887 he was invited as a "full professor" to the Imperial University of Dorpat, and shortly afterwards became director of the medical clinic and policlinic at the University of Bonn, where he spent the remainder of his career.

Schultze is remembered for his numerous medical publications involving neuroanatomical and neuropathological investigations that he performed. In 1884 he was credited with being the first physician to describe a neurological disorder that later became known as Charcot-Marie-Tooth disease. He also provided an early description of acroparesthesia. In 1891 with Wilhelm Heinrich Erb (1840–1921) and Adolph Strümpell (1853–1925), he founded the journal Deutsche Zeitschrift für Nervenheilkunde.

His name is lent to the eponymous "comma tract of Schultze" (interfascicular fasciculus), a compact bundle of posterior root fibers situated near the border between the fasciculus gracilis (tract of Goll) and cuneate fasciculus (tract of Burdach) of the spinal cord.

== Selected writings ==
- Experimentelles über die Sehnenreflexe (with Paul Fürbringer 1849-1930); Centralblatt für die medizinischen Wisenschaften, Berlin, 1875 - Experiments involving tendon reflexes.
- Über die Tetanie und die mechanische Erregbarkeit der peripheren Nerven, über die sekundäre Degenerationen des Rückenmarkes, Centralblatt für die medizinischen Wisenschaften, Berlin, 1876 & 1878, also in Archiv für Psychiatrie und Nervenkrankheiten, Berlin, XIV. - On tetany and mechanical excitability of the peripheral nerves, etc.
- Über Akroparästhesie. 1893, Deutsche Zeitschrift für Nervenheilkunde 3: 300-318 - On acroparesthesia.
- Lehrbuch der Nervenkrankheiten. volume 1, Stuttgart, 1898. VIII + 386 pages, a second volume was planned, but never materialized. - Textbook of nervous diseases.
- Die Krankheiten der Hirnhäute und die Hydrocephalie, in Hermann Nothnagel's Specielle Pathologie und Therapie, volume 9, 3, Vienna, 1901. - Diseases of the meninges and hydrocephalus.
