= Francisco Orts Llorca =

Physician, anatomist and embryologist

Francisco Orts Llorca (1905–1993) was a physician, anatomist and embryologist who worked as a professor of anatomy at the University of Madrid.

== Biography ==
Llorca was born in city of Tampico, Mexico in the year 1905 in a Spanish family. His father was a sailor. At the age of three, his family moved to live in Benidorm (Marina Baja). Llorca graduated in Medicine and Surgery from the University of Valencia in 1928. In 1935, he was appointed as the chair of anatomy at the University of Cádiz.

During the Spanish Civil War, he took refuge in the Republican area. He was a disciple of Henri Rouviére in Paris, Alfred Fischel in Vienna, Walter Vogt in Munich and Pedro Ara Sarriá in Madrid . His international travels before the Spanish Civil War were financed by the Board for the Expansion of Scientific Studies and Research (Junta para Ampliación de Estudios e Investigaciones Científicas), who later built an experimental embryology laboratory for him. He was appointed Professor of Anatomy at the University of Madrid. He is considered as one of the pioneers in the field of anatomy along with Hermann Braus in Spain. He is also known as the founder of the field experimental embryology. Llorca died in the year 1993.

== Accolades ==
- Doctor honoris causa from the National University of Córdoba (Argentina)
- Doctor honoris causa from the University of Barcelona
- Grand Cross of the Civil Order of Health (1978)
- Cross of St. George (1987)

== Works ==
In addition to dozens of research works in embryology (both theoretical and experimental), he published :

- La fisiología del desarrollo y su importancia en biología(1956)
- Tratamiento del infarto cerebral (1979)

== Notable students ==
He had founded an extensive anatomical school, only comparable at the time with the one created by José Escolar García.Both had extensive impact in the Spanish territory during the period of the Franco dictatorship and the Democratic Transition.
