= Cannon A waves =

Clinical sign related to the circulatory system

Cannon A Waves
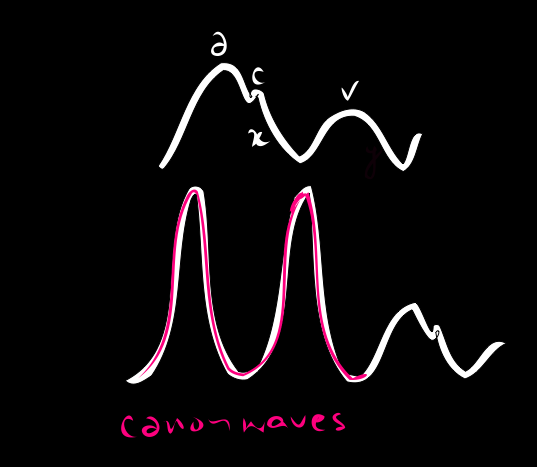
- Cannon A waves as compared to a normal venous pressure tracing.
- Specialty: Cardiology
- Symptoms: Dyspnea, fatigue, headache, hypotension, loss of consciousness, palpitations, cough, jaw pain
- Causes: Ventricular tachycardia, third degree AV block, pacemaker syndrome
- Diagnostic method: Physical exam, venous pressure tracing
- Treatment: Address the underlying cause

Cannon A waves, or cannon atrial waves, are waves seen occasionally in the jugular vein of humans with certain cardiac arrhythmias. When the atria and ventricles happen to contract simultaneously, the right atrium contracts against a closed tricuspid valve, resulting in back pressure into the venous system that can be seen in the jugular venous pulse as a high-amplitude "cannon wave". It is associated with heart block, in particular third-degree (complete) heart block, ventricular tachycardia, and pacemaker syndrome.

Cannon A waves can be identified either on physical exam by examining the jugular venous pulse or a venous pressure tracing. Symptoms can include pulsation in the neck and abdomen, headache, shortness of breath, fatigue, hypotension, and loss of consciousness. Cannon A waves should be differentiated from giant A waves, which may appear similar at first glance but have a unique presentation and etiology.

== Normal venous pressure tracings ==
In order to appreciate an abnormality such as a cannon A wave when examining a venous pressure tracing, we must first understand what is normal. Venous pressure tracings are constructed using measurements of the right atrial filling pressure throughout the cardiac cycle. These changes in pressure can be monitored via a central line in which a catheter is inserted into the cavoatrial junction, the meeting point of the superior vena cava and the right atrium.

In a normal cardiac cycle, five wave forms (a, c, x, v, and y) will be observed representing the following events:

a wave - right atrial contraction

c wave - early ventricular contraction

x descent - right atrial relaxation

v wave - right atrial filling

y descent - early ventricular filling prior to atrial contraction

These events can be superimposed on a rhythm strip to better understand their relationship to the cardiac cycle.

== Signs and symptoms ==
Most of the symptoms associated with cannon A waves are secondary to the resulting insufficient cardiac output. These include:

- Dyspnea
- Fatigue
- Headache
- Hypotension
- Loss of consciousness
- Palpitations
- Cough
- Jaw Pain

On physical exam, it is important to look for prominent jugular veins with significant pulsation. Pulsations of the abdomen in patients with a small body habitus may also be visible.

== Pathophysiology ==
Cannon A waves represent a massive increase in right atrial pressure. This occurs when the right atrium contracts against a closed tricuspid valve. Normally, the tricuspid valve opens when the pressure in the right atrium exceeds the pressure in the left ventricle. However, because the ventricle has more mass and therefore produces a stronger contraction, if both chambers contract simultaneously, the atrial pressure will be unable to exceed that of the ventricle, and the tricuspid valve will remain closed. Thus, the contractile force normally used to fill the right ventricle will instead remain in the atrium, leading to a rapid increase in pressure and subsequent backflow of blood into the venous system.

Cannon A waves should not be confused with giant A waves, which are a similar but different phenomenon caused by atrial contraction against a noncompliant right ventricle or stiff tricuspid valve. Larger than normal A waves are seen, but because there is no AV dissociation, coordination between atrial contraction and ventricular diastole remains intact, and the waves occur in a regular pattern. This is often secondary to things like pulmonary hypertension or tricuspid stenosis.

== Causes and treatment ==
Anything that causes disruption of the normal cardiac cycle, leading to AV desynchronization, can result in a cannon A wave. Common examples of this include AV block (primarily 3rd degree), ventricular tachycardia, and pacemaker syndrome. The treatment involves addressing the underlying condition.

3rd Degree AV Block: This is the most intuitive cause of cannon A waves, as the definition of 3rd degree heart block is complete AV dissociation. Impulses from the SA node successfully cause atrial contraction but cannot progress through the AV node to excite the ventricle; thus, the intrinsic escape rhythm of the ventricle takes over. This results in the atria and ventricles contracting completely independently from one another, which opens the door for coinciding contractions and subsequent cannon A waves. This is typically resolved with the insertion of a pacemaker.

Ventricular Tachycardia: Occurs when the ventricles contract rapidly, independent of the upstream conduction system. The atria continue to fire at their own rate despite the high frequency of ventricular contraction, making it likely that the two will coincide, leading to atrial contraction against a closed AV valve. Treating the arrhythmia will lead to the resolution of the cannon A waves. In hemodynamically unstable patients, immediate cardioversion is indicated, while hemodynamically stable patients can be treated pharmacologically with an antiarrhythmic.

Pacemaker Syndrome: Most commonly occurs in patients with a single chamber pacemaker (VVI). Because this type of pacemaker is sensing and responding only to the activity of the ventricle and not the atria, mistimed contractions may occur, leading to inability of the tricuspid valve to open and insufficient filling of the ventricle. This can often be resolved by altering the pacemaker programming or adding a right atrium pacemaker lead to facilitate AV synchronization.
