= Adolf Kussmaul =

German physician (1822–1902)

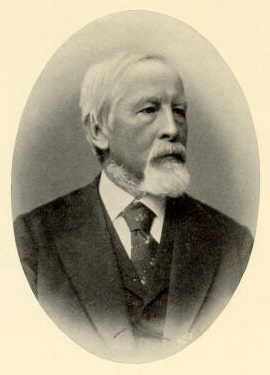
- Born: 22 February 1822
- Died: 28 May 1902 (aged 80)
- Education: Heidelberg University
- Occupation: Physician

Adolf Kussmaul (German: Carl Philipp Adolf Konrad Kußmaul; 22 February 1822 – 28 May 1902) was a German physician and a leading clinician of his time.

== Biography ==
Adolf Kussmaul was born as the son and grandson of physicians in Graben near Karlsruhe. He studied medicine at Heidelberg University. In 1846, he passed the staatsexamen and became assistant to Karl von Pfeufer. He entered the army after graduation and spent two years as an army surgeon. This was followed by a period as a general practitioner before he went to Würzburg to study for his doctorate under Virchow.

He was subsequently Professor of Medicine at Heidelberg (1857), Erlangen (1859), Freiburg (1859) and Straßburg (1876).

Beyond his medical skills he was also active in literature. He is regarded as one of the creators of the term Biedermeier, an art movement. He died in Heidelberg.

== Eponymous terms ==
His name continues to be used in eponyms. He described two medical signs and one disease which have eponymous names that remain in use:

- Kussmaul breathing – very deep and labored breathing with normal, rapid or reduced frequency seen in severe diabetic ketoacidosis (DKA).
- Kussmaul's sign – paradoxical rise in the jugular venous pressure (JVP) on inhalation in constrictive pericarditis or chronic obstructive pulmonary disease (COPD).
- Kussmaul disease (also called Kussmaul–Maier disease) – polyarteritis nodosa. Named with Rudolf Robert Maier (1824–1888).

The following eponymous terms are considered archaic:

- Kussmaul's coma – diabetic coma due to ketoacidosis.
- Kussmaul's aphasia – selective mutism.
- Kussmaul's pulse – pulsus paradoxus.
- Kussmaul–Landry paralysis – Guillain–Barré syndrome.
- Kussmaul asserts that, after a violent death, in a muscular subject, rigor mortis often

continues for 14 days or longer.

== Firsts ==
- First to describe dyslexia in 1877, which he called 'word blindness'.
- First to describe polyarteritis nodosa.
- First to describe progressive bulbar paralysis.
- First to describe selective mutism.
- First to diagnose mesenteric embolism.
- First to perform pleural tapping and gastric lavage.
- First to attempt oesophagoscopy and gastroscopy.
- First to describe the emotional symptoms of mercury exposure as a first stage preceding the physical effects.
