= Terminal lucidity =

Sign of impending death

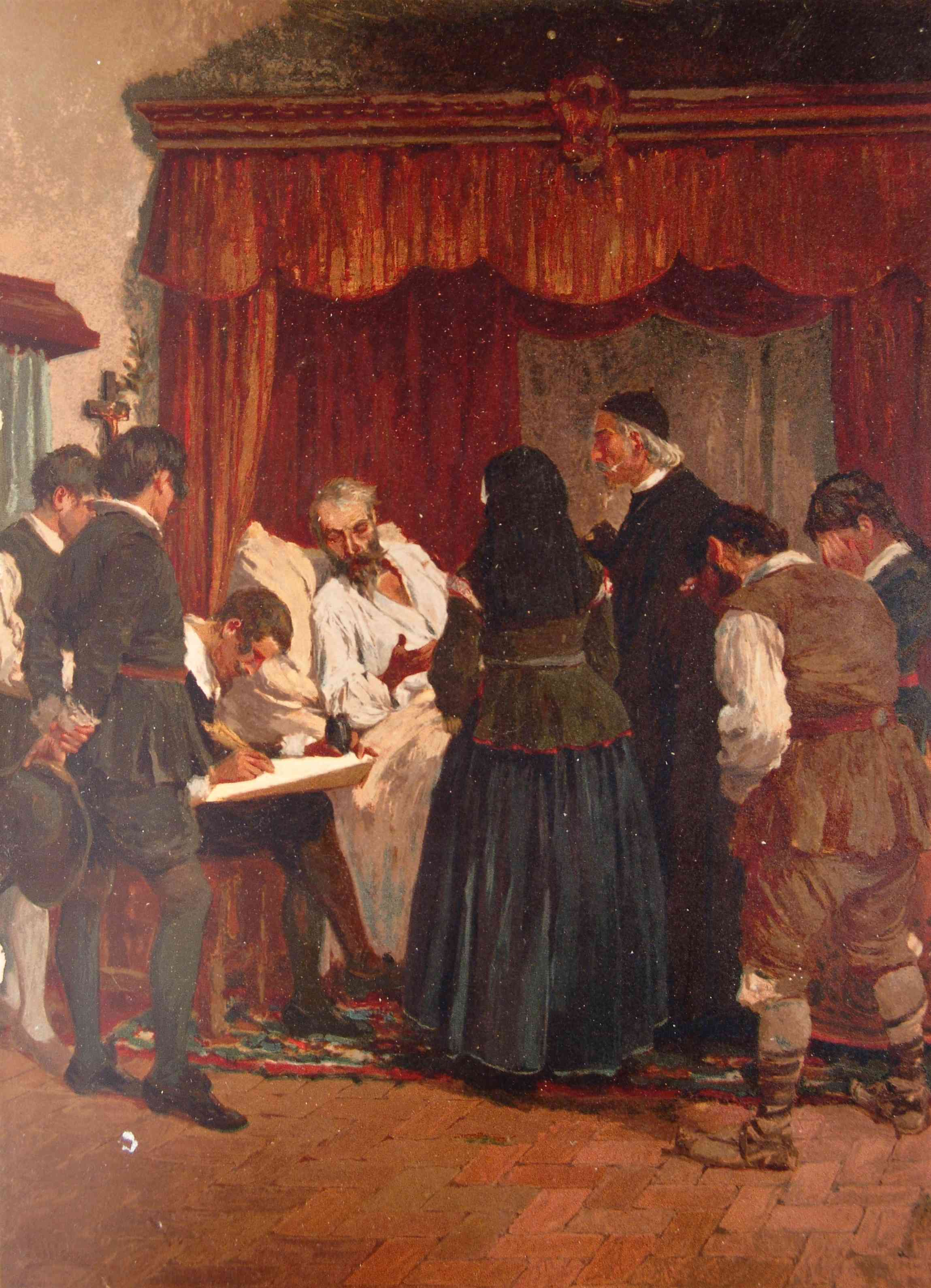
Alonso Quijano, the title character of Don Quixote, recovering from madness on his deathbed

Terminal lucidity is an unexpected return of mental clarity shortly before death in people who have previously been dull, confused, demented, or nonresponsive. The term was coined in 2009 by biologist Michael Nahm and psychiatrist Bruce Greyson. Remarkable cases have occurred in individuals with severe psychiatric or neurological disorders. Cases have been reported since the 19th century and have also been called premortem clarity or lightening up before death. (Note: Similar terms such as the last rally, energy surge, or pre-mortem surge imply a surge of bodily vitality in addition to the surge of enhanced mental clarity.) The related term paradoxical lucidity describes a surge of mental clarity in people with severe neurodegeneration of the brain, but its occurrence is not restricted to the time before death. Terminal lucidity is not considered a medical term and there is no official consensus on the identifying characteristics.

Terminal lucidity is poorly understood in medical and psychological research, and there is no consensus on what the underlying mechanisms are. It has occurred in cases of severe dementia, challenging the idea that such conditions are irreversible.

Studying terminal lucidity presents ethical challenges because of informed consent. Care providers also face ethical challenges of whether to provide deep sedation, which might limit terminal lucidity, and how to respond to requests for a change in care plans from family members.

== History ==
Several case reports in the 19th century described the unusual condition of an improvement and recovery of the mental state in people days or weeks before death. In 1887, William Munk called it "lightening up before death".

According to historical reviews headed by Nahm, cases have been noted in individuals with diseases which cause progressive cognitive impairment, such as Alzheimer's disease, but also schizophrenia, tumors, strokes, meningitis, and Parkinson's disease. This makes terminal lucidity difficult to classify. Researchers are unclear if it is a phenomenon that occurs in all people regardless of their medical history. In 2018, a group of researchers at Dongguk University Ilsan Hospital published a study involving the observation of people weeks prior to death. Out of 151 deaths, six people experienced terminal lucidity. These six had different admission causes, and upon admission three of them were alert and aware and the other three were drowsy. The most common causes of death among these people were different infectious diseases or cancer complications. A survey of 45 Canadian palliative care volunteers reported that 33% of them personally witnessed at least one case of terminal lucidity within the previous year.

According to Nahm, it may be present even in cases of people with previous mental disability. Nahm defines two subtypes: one that comes gradually (a week before death), and another that comes rapidly (hours before death), with the former occurring more often than the latter. There are many cases reported in literature, although the phrase 'terminal lucidity' was coined in 2009. Although interest in this condition dwindled during the 20th century, further studies have re-examined it.

== Characteristics ==
Terminal lucidity is characterized by a transient reversal in an individual's physical symptoms of disease such as Alzheimer's and other similar dementias. This often takes the form in sudden, unexpected, and short-term mental clarity in patients with late-stage neurological disorders. For example, those who were previously non-verbal or may have limited communication abilities may regain their ability to speak. Those who experience terminal lucidity may also experience sudden recollection and recognition of people they previously could not identify.

During terminal lucidity, cognitive and memory abilities function differently than those of unaffected individuals.

Terminal lucidity commonly occurs in close proximity (<6 months) to the death of the patient experiencing it; however, there are also occurrences in which the patient survives for longer which are more widely referred to as "paradoxical" lucidity as opposed to terminal.

== Similarity to paradoxical lucidity ==
Research in 2020 screened for "paradoxical lucidity", a general term for unexpected remissions in dementias, independent of whether the person died shortly thereafter. The research found that in only 6% of the paradoxical lucidity cases did the person live longer than a week, and stated that it is a "primarily death-related phenomenon". A 2021 systematic review attempted to define the parameters of paradoxical lucidity and recommended three criteria: the person must have a neurological condition; the condition must be considered irreversible; and the condition hinders normal verbal/behavioral capabilities.

These stipulations are not static and are subject to change. For instance, the second criterion states the condition must be considered irreversible. But as new research emerges and more insight is gained on previously poorly understood mechanisms involving the brain, it may be discovered that what was initially assumed to be permanent is actually reversible.

Paradoxical lucidity is considered a challenge to the irreversibility paradigm of chronic degenerative dementias. The similarities between paradoxical and terminal lucidity may suggest a shared common mechanism. Having a thorough understanding of both types of phenomenon can facilitate researchers in advancing the scope of their study.

== Possible mechanisms ==
All proposed mechanisms should be considered as anecdotal evidence and hypothetical because there are no neuroscientific studies of terminal lucidity. However, near-death experiences, a related concept to terminal lucidity, can provide insight into possible mechanisms.

Near-death experiences have been reported worldwide, independent of culture, by people who unexpectedly recovered from life-threatening injury or by individuals who escaped a potentially fatal situation. People have described their near-death experience as an "out-of-body experience", "sense of unity with nature", "apparent memory of a previous life", etc. Near-death experiences are often compared to terminal lucidity because both involve a surge of mental clarity or vivid consciousness during a life-threatening crisis; however, while terminal lucidity is typically a precursor to actual death, many individuals who experience a near-death experience survive and are resuscitated.

There is little research on the mechanism of near-death experiences because it is hard to determine who will experience them. Case reports have found that there is a sudden increase in brain electrical activity that is normally associated with consciousness in people who are dying due to critical illness. Even though this electrical abnormality could just be the cell membrane losing activity because of a lack of oxygen, it is possible that the surge of neurophysiological activity before death is related to terminal lucidity.

=== Timeline ===
A study reviewing existing case reports, mostly from physicians during the 19th century, found that 84% of people who have moments of mental clarity before dying usually die within a week, and 43% of them die within 24 hours. A 2020 study in Europe and the United States that surveyed healthcare providers of people who have severe memory problems discovered that these moments of mental clarity lasted up to 24 hours in 87% of cases, and 79% of those cases involved people who could communicate clearly and coherently. About 66% of patients died within two days of experiencing mental clarity.

=== Early research ===
The earliest attempt at explanation was issued by Benjamin Rush in 1812, who hypothesized that a reawakening could be due to a nervous excitation caused by pain or fever, or because of dead blood vessels, released by a leakage of water in the brain chambers.

In 1826, Karl Friedrich Burdach, a physiologist and anatomist, focused on the anatomy of the brains of people who died and experienced this phenomenon. He noted changes in their brains, for example, there was blood outflow within the brain, presence of an unusual fluid filling the brain, increase in the size of the brain or softening in some parts of the brain.

In 1839, Johannes Friedreich, a physician, reviewed case reports of people who experienced terminal lucidity. He proposed that the factors causing impairments and brain dysfunctions may be reversed shortly before death, because some studies showed that people who have water in their brains (hydrocephalus) will have less water before they die. He suggested that this could be induced by fever, but none of the terminal lucidity cases included high fever or deteriorated brain tissues.

=== Current research ===
In 2009, Macleod reached conclusions based on his own observations, rather than witness statements which the majority of other case studies used. Out of 100 deaths that happened in a hospice, 6 cases experienced terminal lucidity which lasted 12 hours and the people died 48 hours later. Benzodiazepines (depressants that produce sedation and hypnosis) and antiemetics (medications to ease nausea and vomiting) were used, but their doses did not exceed the recommended maximum, although a high dose of an opioid was used in one case. Macleod was not able to find any predictors or causes of terminal lucidity, but he suggested that terminal lucidity was more common in the past because in modern pharmacology there are guidelines and recommendations for medication usage. For example, doctors in the past did not have a dosage limit for opioids, and did not have the medications to ease nausea and vomiting.

In 2018, the US National Institute on Aging (NIA) announced two funding opportunities in order to encourage scientists to advance the nascent science of lucidity. Of these funded studies, a lab at New York University was awarded a five-year grant in 2020 for their proposal to measure the actual brain activity, record audio and video, and have caregivers keep diaries, making it the first in depth study focusing on lucidity in dementia patients.

In 2021, a non-tested hypothesis of neuromodulation was proposed, whereby near-death discharges of neurotransmitters and corticotropin-releasing peptides act upon preserved circuits of the medial prefrontal cortex and hippocampus, promoting memory retrieval and mental clarity. This study also proposed a relationship between lucid dreaming and terminal lucidity, suggesting further research should be conducted to explore the similarities of brain signals between the two.

=== Ongoing research ===
A study by NYU Langone Health in collaboration with the NIA which began in 2022 and is set to end in 2026 "aims to establish methods for measuring episodes of lucidity" in people with severe end-stage dementia.

The Penn Program on Precision Medicine for the Brain (P^{3}MB) have several current projects in partnership with various organizations such as the Alzheimer's Association, the CDC, and the NIA. Undertaking a multidisciplinary approach, P^{3}MB conducts and participates in various research involving neurological diseases with the aim to potentially translate new discoveries into clinical practice. Their discoveries have the potential to influence the current understanding of terminal lucidity.

BioMed Central's Molecular Neurodegeneration journal explores the neurological implications of terminal and paradoxical lucidity, and the possibility that the sudden recovery of mental clarity may suggest that it is possible to recover functions previously thought to be lost in later stages of dementia. The study discusses a possible treatment to memory-related diseases which involves microdosage of dimethyltryptamine (DMT), a natural hallucinogen, to promote neuroplasticity and "reopen" the brain's critical learning window, paired with learning and behavioral training. This process is being explored as a potential treatment for Alzheimer's disease, though as of 2024 further research is still required to ensure safety and determine long-term effects.

== Ethical considerations ==
In his 2009 study, Macleod discussed how modern medical practices, such as the use of sedative medications, may contribute to the rarity of terminal lucidity. Deep sedation, which is often used to alleviate intractable symptoms, could deprive patients of the opportunity to experience moments of clarity and connection with loved ones before dying.

Understanding the mechanism behind terminal lucidity has ethical implications for how researchers design studies. Study participants with severe neurological disorders such as schizophrenia or dementia may not have the capacity to provide informed consent. Another ethical issue is whether study participation is voluntary. Care-givers or administrators at nursing homes and long-term care facilities may exert undue influence on individuals living there. One report stated "voluntarism of vulnerable subjects is usually compromised". Another report recommended having policy discussions and protocols in place that can address and minimize the potential for harm to the individual. Ethical dilemmas may arise in cases of individuals with advanced cognitive impairment who experience terminal lucidity, because healthcare providers must balance respecting previously expressed wishes with any newfound information presented during the lucid episode. One report recommended early conversations between end-of-life patients and healthcare providers so that medical decisions can be made that are in line with each patient's values and preferences, even in the presence of fluctuating cognitive states.

Terminal lucidity may have a significant influence on families. Some family members may believe that their loved ones are improving, only to experience their death soon after. After an episode of consciousness, family members may request the clinicians to modify the care plan hoping for a recurrence of such moments. Clinicians are also affected as they try to help and comfort the family members who are dealing with a phenomenon that is not well-understood. Terminal lucidity may provide a positive experience for family members who see these moments of clarity as a way to resolve unfinished business, reach closure, or reaffirm spiritual beliefs. As a result, several reports recommend providing guidelines for clinical practice.
