= Nikolaus Friedreich =

German pathologist and neurologist (1825–1882)

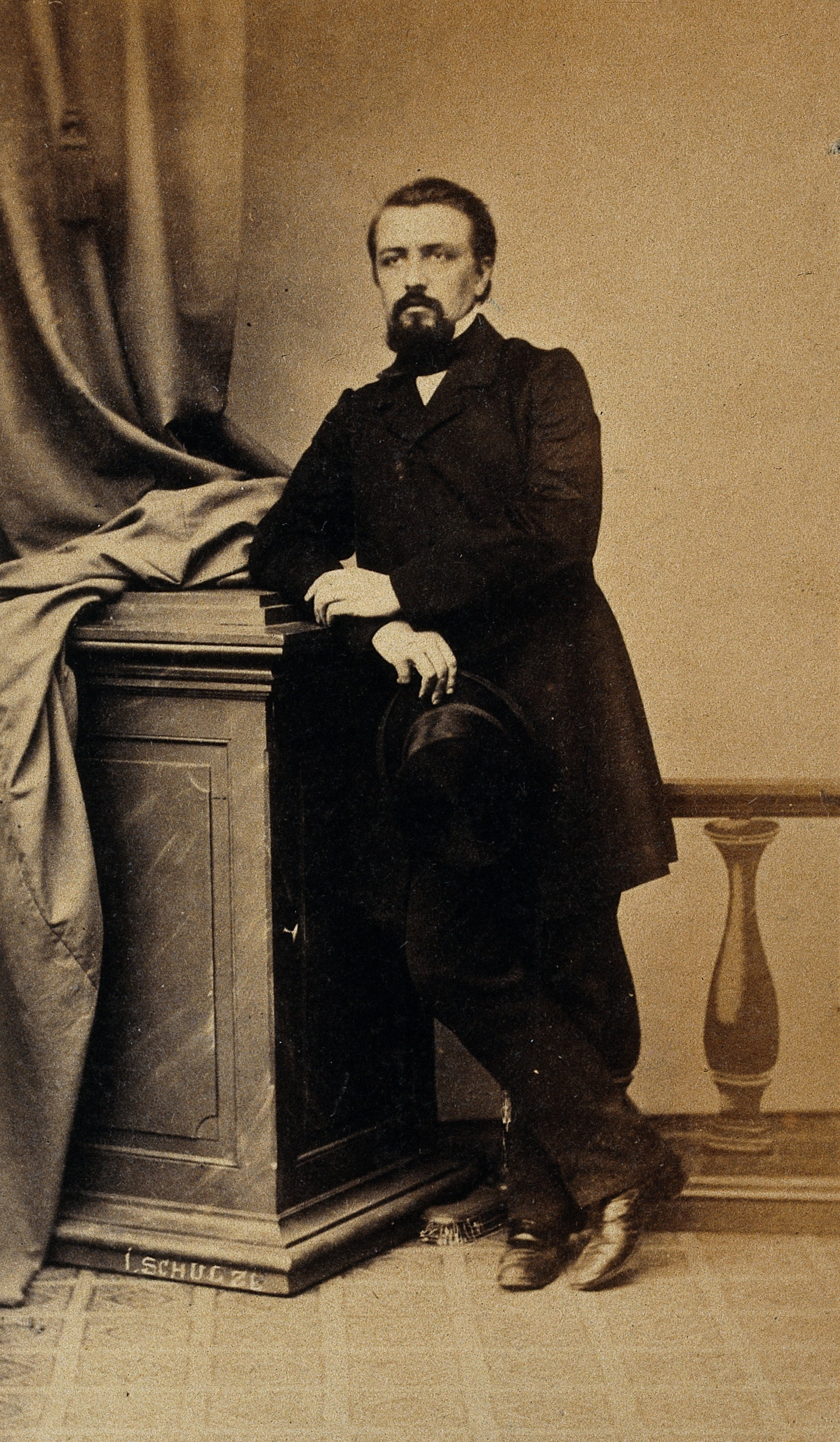
- Born: 1 July 1825
- Died: 6 July 1882 (aged 57)
- Known for: Friedreich's ataxia
- Scientific career
- Fields: Neurology

Nikolaus Friedreich (1 July 1825 in Würzburg – 6 July 1882 in Heidelberg) was a German pathologist and neurologist, and a third generation physician in the Friedreich family. His father was psychiatrist Johann Baptist Friedreich (1796–1862), and his grandfather was pathologist Nicolaus Anton Friedreich (1761–1836), who is remembered for his early description of idiopathic facial paralysis, which would later be known as Bell's palsy.

== Biography ==
In the early part of his career he studied and practiced medicine at the University of Würzburg under the tutelage of noted men such as physiologist Albert von Kölliker and pathologist Rudolf Virchow. He later became a professor of pathological anatomy at Würzburg, then in 1858 was appointed a professor of pathology and therapy at the University of Heidelberg, where he remained for the rest of his career. Some of his better known students and assistants included Adolf Kussmaul, Wilhelm Heinrich Erb and Friedrich Schultze.

Friedreich was involved in the establishment of pathological correlations, notably in research of muscular dystrophy, spinal ataxia and brain tumors. He is remembered today for "Friedreich's ataxia", which he identified in 1863. It is a degenerative disease with sclerosis of the spinal cord that affects a person's speech, balance and coordination.

== Associated eponyms ==
- "Friedreich's ataxia": a genetic neurodegenerative disorder characterized by an unusual gait pattern
- "Friedreich's disease" or Friedreich's syndrome (paramyoclonus multiplex): an hereditary disease characterized by brief, sudden muscular contractions in the proximal muscles of the extremities.
- "Friedreich's foot" or pes cavus: abnormally high arches in the feet.
- "Friedreich's sign": collapse of cervical veins that were previously distended during diastole (heart relaxation), and is caused by an adherent pericardium.
- "Friedreich's sound change": term for difference in tension (pitch of percussion note) in the cavum wall during expiration and inspiration.
- "Friedreich-Auerbach disease": hypertrophy of the tongue, ears and facial features. Named with anatomist Leopold Auerbach.
- "Friedreich-Erb-Arnold syndrome": An osteodermopathic syndrome characterized by a corrugated overgrowth of the scalp (bull-dog scalp or cutis verticis gyrata), facial hypertrophy, clubbed digits due to soft tissue hyperplasia, enlarged hands and feet and elephantiasis. Named with Wilhelm Erb and Julius Arnold (1835-1915).

== Selected publications ==
- Beiträge zur Lehre von den Geschwülsten innerhalb der Schädelhöhle. Habilitation thesis, 1853.
- Ein neuer Fall von Leukämie. In Virchow's Archiv für pathologische Anatomie und Physiologie und für klinische Medicin, Berlin, 1857, 12: 37-58. (First description of acute leukaemia).
- Die Krankheiten der Nase, des Kehlkopfes, der Trachea, der Schild- und Thymusdrüse. In Virchow’s Handbuch der speciellen Pathologie und Therapie. 1858. (Diseases of the nose, larynx, trachea, the thyroid and thymus).
- Ein Beitrag zur Pathologie der Trichinenkrankheit beim Menschen. In Virchow's Archiv für pathologische Anatomie und Physiologie und für klinische Medicin, Berlin, 1862, 25: 399-413. (A contribution to the pathology of trichinosis in humans).
- Die Krankheiten des Herzens. In Virchow’s Handbuch der speciellen Pathologie und Therapie. Erlangen, 1854, 5, 1 Abt, 385-530. 2nd edition, Erlangen, F. Enke, 1867. (Diseases of the heart).
- Ueber degenerative Atrophie der spinalen Hinterstränge In Virchow's Archiv für pathologische Anatomie und Physiologie und für klinische Medicin, Berlin, (A) 26: 391, 433; 1863. (On degenerative atrophy of the spinal dorsal columns).
- Ueber Ataxie mit besonderer berücksichtigung der hereditären Formen. In Virchow's Archiv für pathologische Anatomie und Physiologie und für klinische Medicin, Berlin, 1863. (On ataxia with special reference to hereditary forms).
- Die Heidelberger Baracken für Krigesepidemien während des Feldzuges 1870 und 1871, Heidelberg, 1871.
- Ueber progressive Muskelatrophie, über wahre und falsche Muskelatrophie, Berlin, 1873.
- Der acute Milztumor und seine Beziehungen zu den acuten Infektionskrankheiten. In Volkmann’s Sammlung klinischer Vorträge, Leipzig, 1874.
- Paramyoklonus multiplex. In Virchow's Archiv für pathologische Anatomie und Physiologie, und für klinische Medicin, Berlin, 1881, 86: 421-430. (First description of paramyoclonus multiplex, Friedreich’s disease).

== See also ==
- German inventors and discoverers
