= Paul Fürbringer =

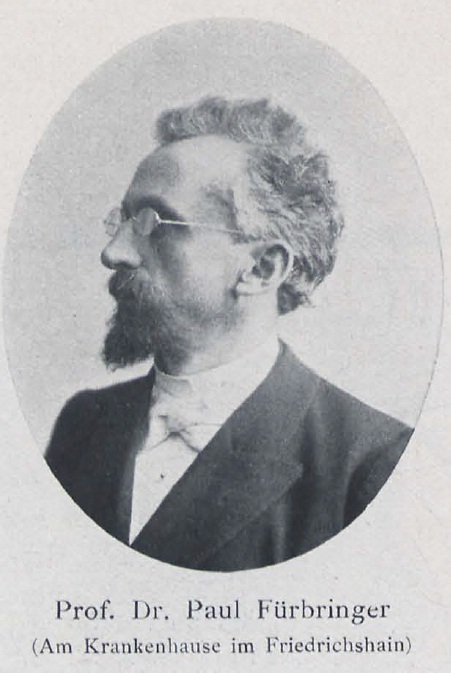
Paul Fürbringer (1901)

Paul Walther Fürbringer (7 August 1849 – 21 July 1930) was a German physician and chemist born in Delitzsch, in the Prussian Province of Saxony. He was a brother to anatomist Max Fürbringer (1846-1920).

He studied medicine at the Universities of Jena and Berlin. He served as an assistant physician during the Franco-Prussian War, afterwards working as an assistant in the institute of pathology at Jena, and in Nikolaus Friedreich's clinic at the University of Heidelberg. In 1876 he received his habilitation for pharmacology and medicinal chemistry with a dissertation involving oxalic acid excretion in the urine.

In 1879 he became an associate professor and head of the district health center in Jena, and during the following year was director of the Amtsphysikat-Jena. From 1886 to 1903 he was director of the city hospital at Friedrichshain-Berlin.

Fürbringer's interests in medicine were many and varied. He performed investigations of salicylic acid as well as research on the effects of mercury; conducted studies on alkaptonuria, liver disease, diseases of the genitourinary system and acute infectious diseases. He also conducted research on subjects such as hand sanitation, physical education, balneology, sexual pathology and impotence.

From 1890 to 1921 he was a member of the Medizinalkollegiums for Berlin and Brandenburg.

== Written works ==
- Zur vergleichenden Anatomie der Muskeln des Kopfskeletts der Zyklostomen (Jena 1875).
- Untersuchungen und Vorschriften über die Desinfektion der Hände des Arztes, 1888 (Studies and regulations for disinfection of the hands of the physician).
- Die Krankheiten der Harn- und Geschlechtsorgane (1884; second edition 1890) -- "Textbook of diseases of the kidneys and urinary organs"; translated from the German with annotations by W.H. Gilbert; commendatory letter from Sir Thomas Grainger Stewart (London : H.K. Lewis, 1895).
- Über die Punktionstherapie der serösen Pleuritis und ihre Indikation 1890 (On puncture therapy of serous pleurisy and its indication).
