= Palpitations =

Perceived cardiac abnormality in which one's heartbeat can be felt

Palpitation
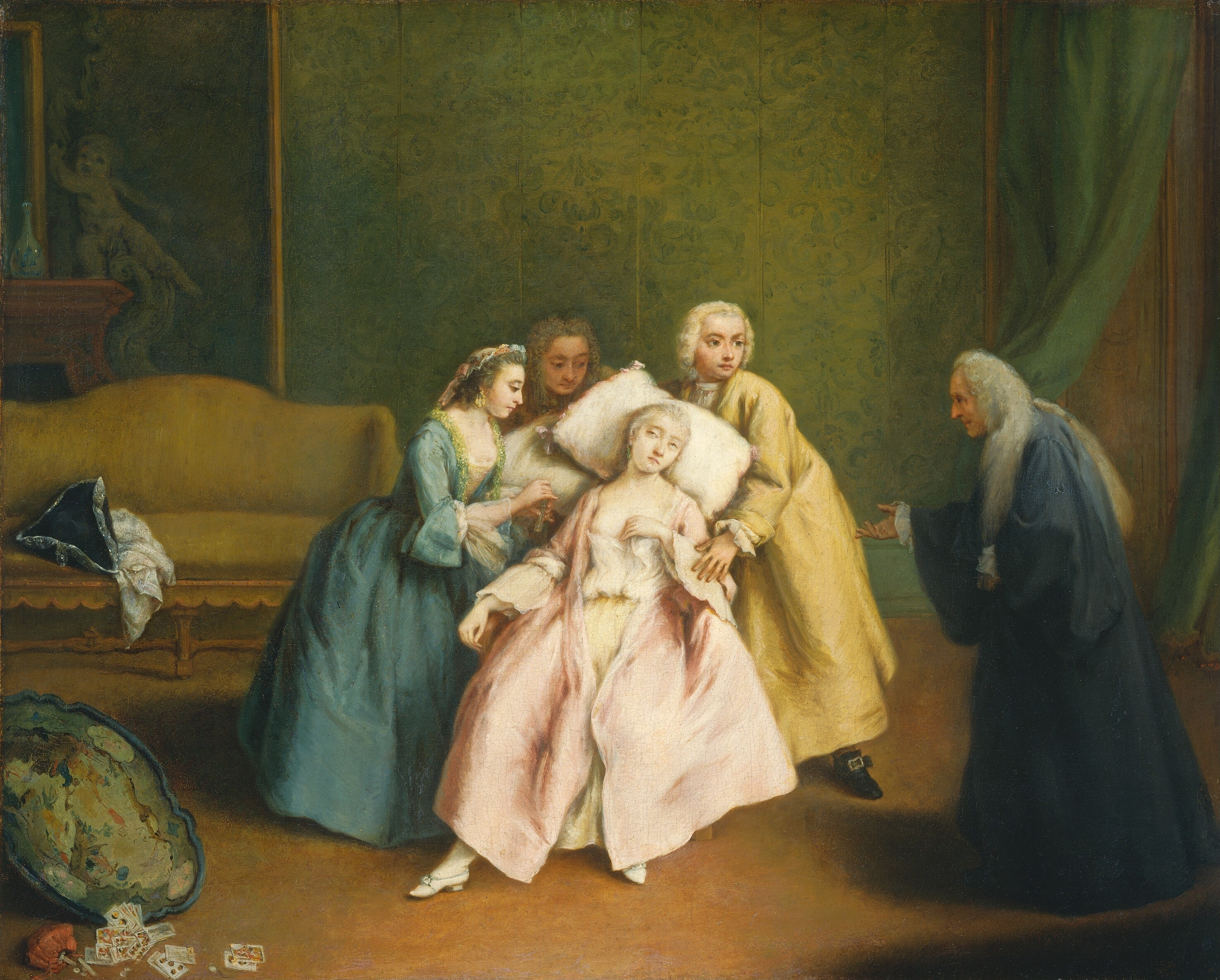
- Artistic impression of a woman experiencing syncope, which may accompany heart palpitations
- Specialty: Cardiology
- Differential diagnosis: Tachycardia

Palpitations occur when a person becomes aware of their heartbeat. The heartbeat may feel hard, fast, or uneven in their chest.

Symptoms include a very fast or irregular heartbeat. Palpitations are a sensory symptom. They are often described as a skipped beat, a rapid flutter, or a pounding in the chest or neck.

Palpitations are not always the result of a physical problem with the heart and can be linked to anxiety. However, they may signal a fast or irregular heartbeat. Palpitations can be brief or long-lasting. They can be intermittent or continuous. Other symptoms can include dizziness, shortness of breath, sweating, headaches, and chest pain.

There are a variety of causes of palpitations not limited to the following:

Palpitation may be associated with coronary heart disease, perimenopause, hyperthyroidism, adult heart muscle diseases like hypertrophic cardiomyopathy, congenital heart diseases like atrial septal defects, diseases causing low blood oxygen such as asthma, emphysema or a blood clot in the lungs; previous chest surgery; kidney disease; blood loss and pain; anemia; drugs such as antidepressants, statins, alcohol, nicotine, caffeine, cocaine and amphetamines; electrolyte imbalances of magnesium, potassium and calcium; and deficiencies of nutrients such as taurine, arginine, iron or vitamin B_{12}.

== Signs and symptoms ==
PVC (a type of palpitation) recording
An audio clip recording of a PVC symptom, made with a cardiac event monitor.

Three common descriptions of palpitation are:

- "flip-flopping" (or "stop and start") is often caused by premature contraction of the atrium or ventricle. The pause after the contraction causes the "stop." The "start" comes from the next forceful contraction.
- rapid "fluttering in the chest" suggests arrhythmias. Regular "fluttering" points to supraventricular or ventricular arrhythmias, including sinus tachycardia. Irregular "fluttering" suggests atrial fibrillation, atrial flutter, or tachycardia with variable block.
- "pounding in the neck" or neck pulsations, often due to cannon A waves in the jugular vein. These occur when the right atrium contracts against a closed tricuspid valve.

Palpitations often come with other symptoms. Knowing these links can help determine if they are dangerous or harmless. However, these links are not definitive and should be evaluated by a licensed healthcare provider to ensure an accurate diagnosis and proper care.

Palpitations associated with chest discomfort or chest pain suggests coronary artery disease. Palpitation associated with light-headedness, fainting or near fainting suggest low blood pressure and may signify a life-threatening cardiac dysrhythmia. Palpitation that occurs regularly with exertion suggests a rate-dependent bypass tract or hypertrophic cardiomyopathy.

If a benign cause for these symptoms isn't found at the first visit, then prolonged heart monitoring at home or in the hospital setting may be needed. Noncardiac symptoms should also be elicited since the palpitations may be caused by a normal heart responding to a metabolic or inflammatory condition. Weight loss could suggest hyperthyroidism. Palpitation can be precipitated by vomiting or diarrhea that leads to electrolyte disorders and hypovolemia. Hyperventilation, hand tingling, and nervousness are common when anxiety or panic disorder is the cause of the palpitations.

== Causes ==
The responsibility for the perception of heartbeat by neural pathways is not clear. It has been hypothesized that these pathways include different structures located both at the intra-cardiac and extra-cardiac level. Palpitations are a widely diffuse complaint and particularly in subjects affected by structural heart disease. The list of causes of palpitations is long, and in some cases, the etiology is unable to be determined. In one study reporting the etiology of palpitations, 43% were found to be cardiac, 31% psychiatric, and approximately 10% were classified as miscellaneous (medication induced, thyrotoxicosis, caffeine, cocaine, anemia, amphetamine, mastocytosis).

The cardiac etiologies of palpitations are the most life-threatening and include ventricular sources (premature ventricular contractions (PVC), ventricular tachycardia and ventricular fibrillation), atrial sources (atrial fibrillation, atrial flutter) high output states (anemia, AV fistula, Paget's disease of bone or pregnancy), structural abnormalities (congenital heart disease, cardiomegaly, aortic aneurysm, or acute left ventricular failure), and miscellaneous sources (postural orthostatic tachycardia syndrome abbreviated as POTS, Brugada syndrome, and sinus tachycardia). Palpitations can be a symptom of mast cell activation syndrome (MCAS).

Palpitation can be attributed to one of five main causes:

1. Extra-cardiac stimulation of the sympathetic nervous system (inappropriate stimulation of the sympathetic and parasympathetic, particularly the vagus nerve, (which innervates the heart), can be caused by anxiety and stress due to acute or chronic elevations in glucocorticoids and catecholamines. Gastrointestinal distress such as bloating or indigestion, along with muscular imbalances and poor posture, can also irritate the vagus nerve causing palpitations)
2. Sympathetic overdrive (panic disorder, low blood sugar, hypoxia, antihistamines (levocetirizine), low red blood cell count, heart failure, mitral valve prolapse).
3. Hyperdynamic circulation (valvular incompetence, thyrotoxicosis, hypercapnia, high body temperature, low red blood cell count, pregnancy).
4. Abnormal heart rhythms (ectopic beat, premature atrial contraction, junctional escape beat, premature ventricular contraction, atrial fibrillation, supraventricular tachycardia, ventricular tachycardia, ventricular fibrillation, heart block).
5. Pectus Excavatum, also known as funnel chest, is a chest wall deformity. When the breastbone (sternum) and attached ribs are sunken in enough to put excess pressure on the heart and lungs which can cause tachycardia and skipped beats.

Palpitations can occur during times of catecholamine excess, such as during exercise or at times of stress. The cause of the palpitations during these conditions is often a sustained supraventricular tachycardia or ventricular tachyarrhythmia. Supraventricular tachycardias can also be induced at the termination of exercise when the withdrawal of catecholamines is coupled with a surge in the vagal tone. Palpitations secondary to catecholamine excess may also occur during emotionally startling experiences, especially in patients with a long QT syndrome.

=== Psychiatric problems ===
Adrenaline, a natural hormone released during periods of emotional and physical stress, can cause palpitations as a result of its effects on the parasympathetic nervous system.

Anxiety and stress elevate the body's level of cortisol and adrenaline, which in turn can interfere with the normal functioning of the parasympathetic nervous system resulting in overstimulation of the vagus nerve. Vagus nerve induced palpitation is felt as a thud, a hollow fluttery sensation, or a skipped beat, depending on at what point during the heart's normal rhythm the vagus nerve fires. In many cases, the anxiety and panic of experiencing palpitations cause a patient to experience further anxiety and increased vagus nerve stimulation. The link between anxiety and palpitation may also explain why many panic attacks involve an impending sense of cardiac arrest. Similarly, physical and mental stress may contribute to the occurrence of palpitation, possibly due to the depletion of certain micronutrients involved in maintaining healthy psychological and physiological function. Gastrointestinal bloating, indigestion and hiccups have also been associated with overstimulation of the vagus nerve causing palpitations, due to branches of the vagus nerve innervating the GI tract, diaphragm, and lungs.

Many psychiatric conditions can result in palpitations including depression, generalized anxiety disorder, panic attacks, and somatization. However one study noted that up to 67% of patients diagnosed with a mental health condition had an underlying arrhythmia. There are many metabolic conditions that can result in palpitations including, hyperthyroidism, hypoglycemia, hypocalcemia, hyperkalemia, hypokalemia, hypermagnesemia, hypomagnesemia, and pheochromocytoma.

=== Medication ===
The medications most likely to result in palpitations include sympathomimetic agents, anticholinergic drugs, vasodilators and withdrawal from beta blockers.

Excessive consumption of caffeine, commonly found in coffee, tea, and energy drinks, is a well-known trigger. Recreational drugs such as cocaine, amphetamines, and MDMA (Ecstasy) are also associated with palpitations and pose significant cardiovascular risks. These substances can lead to serious health issues, including vasospasm-related angina, heart attacks, and strokes. Understanding the impact of these substances is crucial for both prevention and management of palpitations.

== Pathophysiology ==
The sensation of palpitations can arise from extra-systoles or tachyarrhythmia. It is very rarely noted due to bradycardia. Palpitations can be described in many ways. The most common descriptions include a flip-flopping in the chest, a rapid fluttering in the chest, or pounding in the neck. The description of the symptoms may provide a clue regarding the etiology of the palpitations, and the pathophysiology of each of these descriptions is thought to be different. In patients who describe the palpitations as a brief flip-flopping in the chest, the palpitations are thought to be caused by extra- systoles such as supraventricular or ventricular premature contractions. The flip-flop sensation is thought to result from the forceful contraction following the pause, and the sensation that the heart is stopped results from the pause. The sensation of rapid fluttering in the chest is thought to result from a sustained ventricular or supraventricular arrhythmia. Furthermore, the sudden cessation of this arrhythmia can suggest paroxysmal supraventricular tachycardia. This is further supported if the patient can stop the palpitations by using Valsalva maneuvers. The rhythm of the palpitations may indicate the etiology of the palpitations (irregular palpitations indicate atrial fibrillation as a source of the palpitations). An irregular pounding sensation in the neck can be caused by the dissociation of mitral valve and tricuspid valve, and the subsequent atria are contracting against a closed tricuspid and mitral valves, thereby producing cannon A waves. Palpitations induced by exercise could be suggestive of cardiomyopathy, ischemia or channelopathies.

== Diagnosis ==
To diagnose palpitations, patient description is of notable importance, and a complete history and physical exam are essential. Key details are the age symptoms began, the presence of other symptoms such as chest pain, dizziness, or fainting and the situations in which they occur. It may also be helpful to know about their caffeine intake, if deep breathing or changing positions can stop the palpitations, or how the palpitations start and stop - do they begin and end suddenly or gradually, does the heartbeat feel regular or irregular, how fast does the pulse get during an episode, etc. It is useful to know whether the person has found a way to stop the palpitations (like resting or the Valsalva maneuver).

Along with medical and family history, the patient should be asked about all medications, including over-the-counter drugs, their habits such as exercise, caffeine or alcohol and drug.

Diagnosing palpitations can be arduous as it is rare for symptoms to occur during a routine medical exam or an ECG. However, if a heart murmur or abnormal ECG is found, it can provide important clues, and as such a thorough physical exam and ECG are essential. The physical exam should include checking vital signs and a position based blood pressure measurement, listening to the heart and lungs and examining the arms and legs. If the person is not displaying symptoms during the exam, they can tap out the rhythm to show what their heartbeat felt like.

Palpitations that start in childhood are often caused by supraventricular tachycardia (SVT). Palpitations that appear later in life are more likely linked to structural heart problems. A rapid, regular heartbeat is usually due to paroxysmal SVT or ventricular tachycardia. A rapid, irregular rhythm might be due to atrial fibrillation, atrial flutter, or tachycardia with a variable block. Supraventricular and ventricular tachycardias often cause sudden palpitations, beginning and ending rapidly. If someone can stop their palpitations with the Valsalva maneuver, it may indicate SVT. Palpitations with chest pain could mean reduced blood flow to the heart. If the person feels lightheaded or faints, arrhythmias should be considered.

Positive orthostatic vital signs may indicate dehydration or an electrolyte abnormality. A mid-systolic click and heart murmur may indicate mitral valve prolapse. A harsh holo-systolic murmur best heard at the left sternal border which increases with Valsalva may indicate hypertrophic obstructive cardiomyopathy. An irregular rhythm indicates atrial fibrillation or atrial flutter. Evidence of cardiomegaly and peripheral edema may indicate heart failure and ischemia or a valvular abnormality.

=== Evaluation ===
Most patients who experience palpitations have harmless underlying causes. The main purpose of further testing is to identify individuals with higher risk of serious arrhythmia.

A 12-lead electrocardiogram must be performed on every patient complaining of palpitations. The presence of a short PR interval and a delta wave (Wolff-Parkinson-White syndrome) is an indication of the existence of ventricular pre-excitation. Significant left ventricular hypertrophy with deep septal Q waves in I, L, and V4 through V6 may indicate hypertrophic obstructive cardiomyopathy. The presence of Q waves may indicate a prior myocardial infarction as the etiology of the palpitations, and a prolonged QT interval may indicate the presence of the long QT syndrome.

Laboratory studies should be limited initially. A complete blood count can assess for anemia and infection. Serum urea, creatinine and electrolytes assess for electrolyte imbalances and renal dysfunction. Thyroid function tests may reveal hyperthyroidism.

Further diagnostic testing is recommended for those in whom the initial diagnostic evaluation (history, physical examination, and EKG) suggest an arrhythmia, those who are at high risk for an arrhythmia, and those who remain anxious to have a specific explanation of their symptoms. People considered to be at high risk for an arrhythmia include those with organic heart disease or any myocardial abnormality that may lead to serious arrhythmias. These conditions include a scar from myocardial infarction, idiopathic dilated cardiomyopathy, clinically significant valvular regurgitant, or stenotic lesions and hypertrophic cardiomyopathies.

An aggressive diagnostic approach is recommended for those at high risk and can include ambulatory monitoring or electrophysiologic studies. There are three types of ambulatory EKG monitoring devices: Holter monitors, continuous-loop event recorders, and an implantable loop recorders. Patients should be made aware of the properties of the device and the accompanying course of examination. The Holter monitor is a 24-hour monitoring system that is worn by exam takers themselves and records and continuously saves data. Holter monitors are typically worn for a few days. The continuous-loop event recorders are also worn by the exam taker and continuously record data, but the data is saved only when someone manually activates the monitor. The continuous-loop recorders can be long worn for longer periods of time than the Holter monitors and therefore have been proven to be more cost-effective and efficacious than Holter monitors. Also, because the person triggers the device when he/she feel the symptoms, they are more likely to record data during palpitations. An implantable loop recorder is a device that is placed subcutaneously and continuously monitors for the detection of cardiac arrhythmias. These are most often used in those with unexplained syncope and can be used for longer periods of time than the continuous loop event recorders. Electrophysiology testing enables a detailed analysis of the underlying mechanism of the cardiac arrhythmia as well as the site of origin. EPS studies are usually indicated in those with a high pretest likelihood of a serious arrhythmia. The level of evidence for evaluation techniques is based upon consensus expert opinion.

Most people with palpitations display normal heart structure, but valvular defects are possible. In these cases, a doctor may hear a murmur and perform an echocardiogram.

== Treatment ==
=== Non-medical treatments ===
To manage palpitations effectively, incorporating stress and anxiety-reducing techniques, like meditation, deep breathing exercises, or yoga, can help alleviate symptoms by promoting relaxation and reducing the body's stress response. For immediate relief during an episode of palpitations, vagal maneuvers are often used preliminarily in the hospital setting. These maneuvers involves holding one's breath and bearing down—can be employed to stimulate the vagus nerve and slow the heart rate. However, these techniques may provide only temporary relief, and if palpitations persist or are associated with other concerning symptoms, medical evaluation is essential to determine any underlying causes and appropriate treatment options.

While lifestyle modifications can be beneficial, they may not fully address palpitations resulting from ongoing medical conditions, necessitating further medical intervention.

=== Medical treatments ===
Treating palpitations depends on how bad they are and what's causing them.

Radiofrequency ablation is a common treatment for most supraventricular and ventricular tachycardias. Another option is stereotactic radioablation. It was originally performed for tumors. But, it has also treated tough heart rhythm problems. These include ventricular tachycardia and atrial fibrillation.

Some palpitations are caused by extra heartbeats or occur with a normal heart rhythm. These include beats that start above the ventricles or ventricular ectopic beats. These are usually harmless, and patients can be reassured that they're not dangerous. If the symptoms are bothersome or impact daily life, beta-blockers might help. They can also protect healthy people.

People with no symptoms, normal lab tests, and normal EKG results can usually leave the emergency department safely. They should follow up with their primary care doctor or a cardiologist. However, patients with palpitations linked to fainting (syncope), uncontrolled arrhythmias, poor blood flow (hemodynamic issues), or chest pain (angina) should get further evaluation.

If palpitations are due to heart muscle problems, a cardiologist must be involved in the patient's care.

Palpitations from vagus nerve stimulation are usually not due to heart problems. These types of palpitations originate outside the heart and are not a sign of an unhealthy heart muscle. To treat this type of palpitation, the cause of irritation to the vagus nerve or parasympathetic nervous system needs to be found and fixed. Anxiety and stress can worsen vagus nerve-induced palpitations. So, managing stress is key to treatment.

== Prognosis ==
Heart rate monitoring with smartphones and smartwatches is now common. These devices are quite good at finding heart problems such as arrhythmias. They are now used to help diagnose, monitor, and treat various heart conditions. Formal research has found that current smartwatch apps can detect abnormal heart rhythms, like atrial fibrillation and alert people to this. These apps can also detect changes in heart rhythm, like the QT interval, correctly identify these changes in about in a significant majority of people who have them.

These devices are continuing to improve. They seem to be the future of monitoring heart health and catching problems early. Future care could use heart data from mobile devices to ensure timely access to medical care. Additionally, monitoring heart conditions could help assess how well treatments work.

Generic smartwatch with software to monitor cardiac function

Many people worry when they feel palpitations. However, in most cases, the cause of palpitations is harmless, so detailed medical tests are often not needed. Following up with a primary care doctor can help track symptoms and decide if a heart specialist (cardiologist) is needed.

If someone is at high risk of having a serious heart problem, they may need more testing and treatment. Once the cause of palpitations is found, effective treatments exist. They are backed by good medical research. Working closely with patients to make treatment decisions and involving a healthcare team including nurses, nurse practitioners, physician assistants, and doctors can help ensure the best care and follow-up.

== Prevalence ==
Palpitations are common in the general population, more so in those with structural heart disease.

== See also ==
- Cardiac dysrhythmia
