= Constrictive pericarditis =

Hardening of the membrane surrounding the heart

- Other names: Pericarditis – constrictive
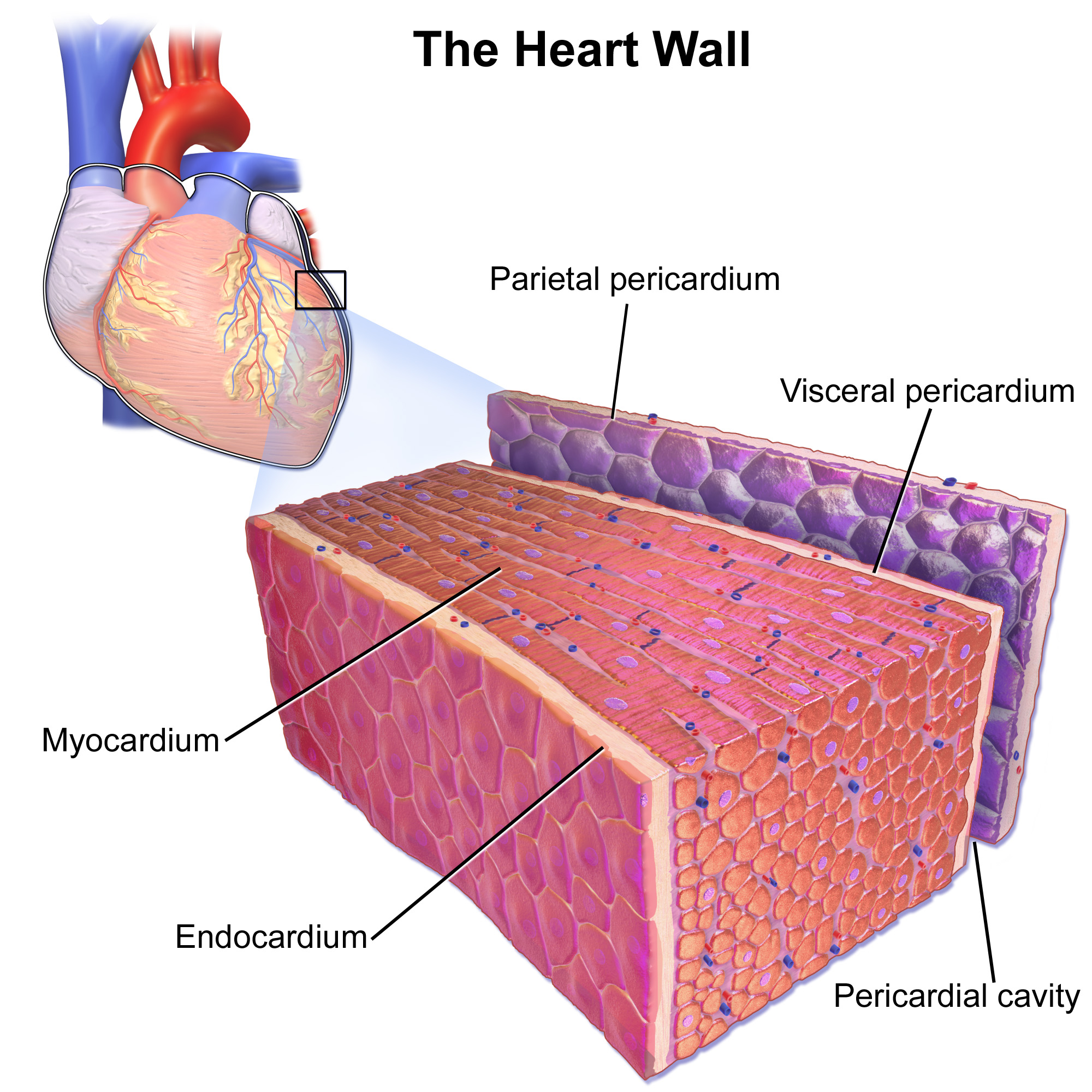
- Constrictive pericarditis is defined by a thickened pericardium and decreased elasticity
- Specialty: Cardiology
- Symptoms: Fatigue, difficulty breathing
- Causes: Tuberculosis, Idiopathic/viral
- Diagnostic method: CT scan, MRI
- Treatment: Anti-inflammatory medication, Surgery

Constrictive pericarditis is a condition characterized by decreased elasticity and an increased thickening of the pericardium. These changes reduce the ability of the heart to fill with blood and can lead to symptoms of heart failure.

This condition may result from various disease processes which can have similar symptoms, and has been historically difficult to diagnose. Understanding the differing etiologies and disease processes is important as it can lead to a timely diagnosis and appropriate treatment.

== Signs and symptoms ==
Constrictive pericarditis can present with symptoms such as difficulty breathing, fatigue, abdominal swelling, or swelling of legs. Physical examination findings can include elevated Jugular venous pressure (JVP), Kussmaul's sign, Peripheral edema, Ascites, Hepatomegaly. Auscultation of the heart may reveal a high-pitched sound during the heart's relaxation phase (Diastole) known as a pericardial knock.

== Causes ==
In areas of the world where Tuberculosis is endemic, it is the most common cause of constrictive pericarditis. Outside of these areas the next most common cause is typically idiopathic or viral in nature. Causes of constrictive pericarditis can include:

- Tuberculosis
- Incomplete drainage of purulent pericarditis
- Fungal and parasitic infections
- Chronic pericarditis
- Postviral pericarditis
- Postsurgical
- Following MI, post-myocardial infarction
- Prior radiation to the Mediastinum
- In association with Pulmonary Asbestosis

== Pathophysiology ==
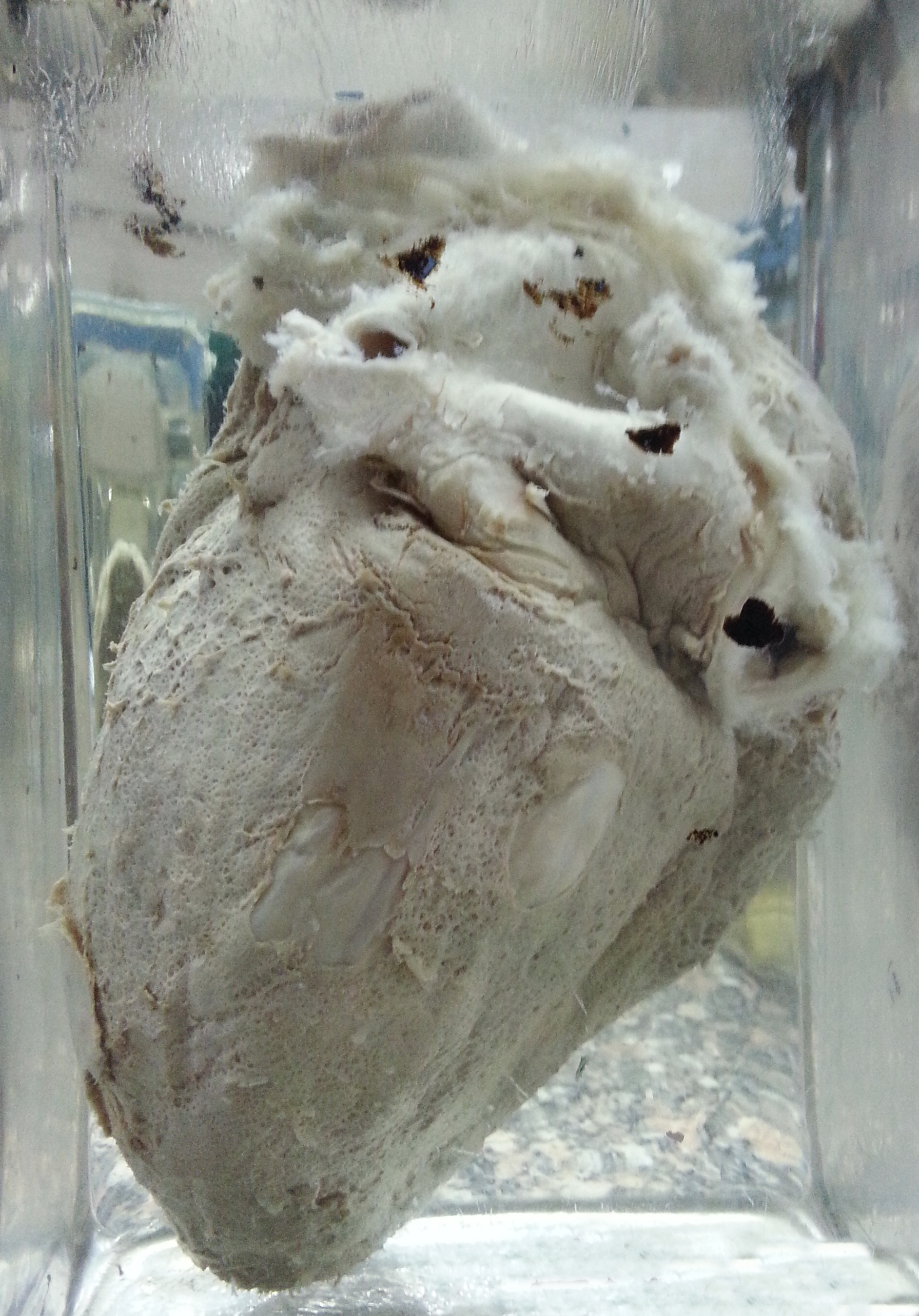
Constrictive pericarditis

The pathophysiological characteristics of constrictive pericarditis are due to a thickened, fibrotic pericardium that forms a non-compliant shell around the heart. This shell prevents the heart from expanding when blood enters it. As pressure on the heart increases, the Stroke volume decreases as a result of a reduction in the ability of the heart to fill blood during Diastole. This results in significant changes in blood flow based on the stage of respiration.

During inspiration, pressure in the thoracic cavity decreases but is not relayed to the left atrium which can lead to a reduced flow to the left atrium and ventricle. During diastole, less blood flow in the left ventricle allows for more room for filling in right ventricle and therefore a septal shift occurs.

During expiration, the amount of blood entering the left ventricle will increase, allowing the interventricular septum to bulge towards the right ventricle, decreasing the right heart ventricular filing.

== Diagnosis ==
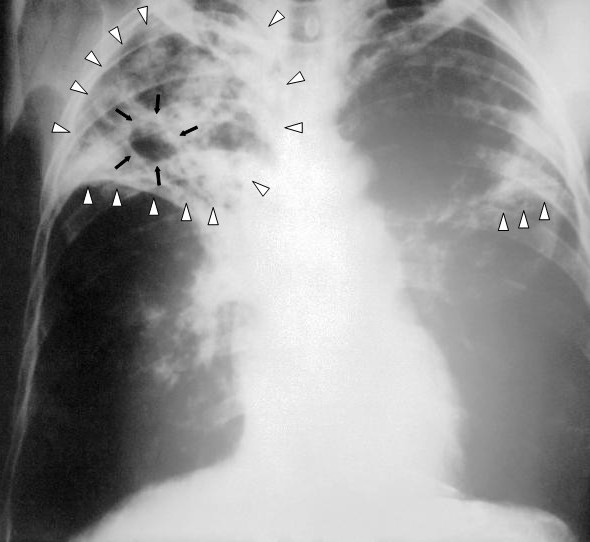
Tuberculosis-x-ray

The diagnosis of constrictive pericarditis is often difficult to make. In particular, restrictive cardiomyopathy has many similar clinical features to constrictive pericarditis, and differentiating them in a particular individual is often a diagnostic dilemma.

- Chest X-Ray - pericardial calcification (common but not specific), pleural effusions are common findings.
- Echocardiography - the principal echographic finding is changes in cardiac chamber volume.
- CT and MRI - CT scan is useful in assessing the thickness of pericardium, calcification, and ventricular contour. Cardiac MRI may find pericardial thickening and pericardial-myocardial adherence. Ventricular septum shift during breathing can also be found using cardiac MRI. Late gadolinium enhancement can show enhancement of the pericardium due to fibroblast proliferation and neovascularization.
- BNP blood test - tests for the existence of the cardiac hormone brain natriuretic peptide, which is only present in restrictive cardiomyopathy but not in constrictive pericarditis
- Conventional cardiac catheterization
- Physical examination - can reveal clinical features including Kussmaul's sign and a pericardial knock.

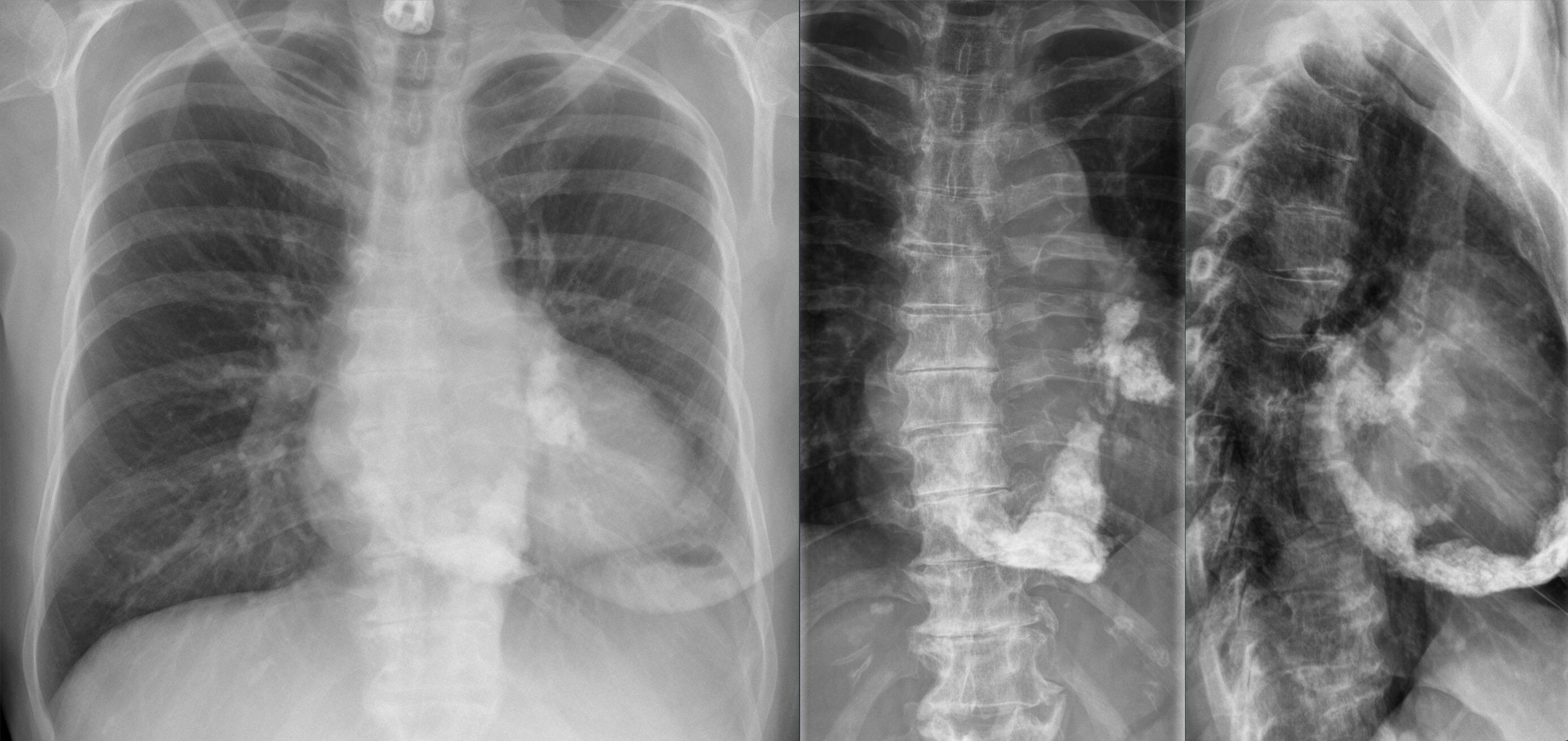
X-ray demonstrating constrictive pericarditis with calcifications.

=== Classification ===
Constrictive pericarditis can be categorized into general syndromes that reflect the nature of the disease development and course.

- Transient (subacute) constrictive pericarditis: constrictive pathophysiology may be reversible due to a transient inflammatory state that resolves without significant fibrosis.
- Advanced (chronic) constrictive pericarditis: constrictive pathophysiology may be irreversible due to significant fibrosis and loss of elasticity over a longer period of time (often 3-6 months).
- Effusive-constrictive pericarditis: similar yet distinct disease process to constrictive pericarditis characterized by a constrictive pathophysiology and the presence of a pericardial effusion.

== Treatment ==
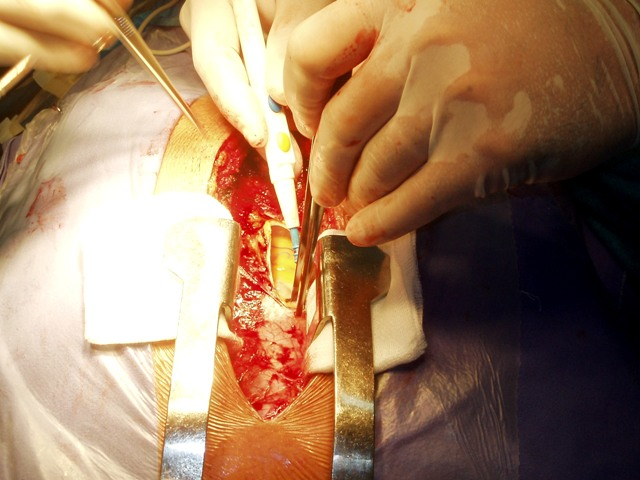
Pericardium visualized in open heart surgery

Transient or subacute constrictive pericarditis is treated with anti-inflammatory medication and can resolve without surgical intervention in many cases. Cases that do not resolve with medication may be treated similar to chronic constrictive cases which often require surgical intervention. In these cases the outcome of surgery may be improved as the pericardial inflammation would be decreased due to the medication trial.

The definitive treatment for advanced or chronic constrictive pericarditis is a radical Pericardiectomy, which is a surgical procedure in which the entire pericardium is peeled away from the heart. This procedure has significant risk involved, with mortality rates of 6% or higher in major referral centers.

A poor outcome is often the result after a pericardiectomy is performed for radiation-induced constrictive pericarditis, and some patients may develop heart failure post-operatively.

== Epidemiology ==
Constrictive pericarditis is a rare complication of many pericardial diseases. It seen as a complication in approximately 1% of idiopathic pericarditis cases, and even fewer cases post cardiac surgery.The geographic distribution of constrictive pericarditis can be categorized based on etiology, with idiopathic or viral pericarditis considered to be the leading cause in Western countries.In Western countries the remaining causes tend to be post-surgical, post-radiation, infectious, and connective tissue disorders. In some developing countries Tuberculosis has been noted as the leading cause of constrictive pericarditis.
