= Archipterygium theory =

Archipterygium (or ancient fin) is the concept of a primitive limb from which the limbs of tetrapod animals evolved. The idea was proposed by Carl Gegenbaur in 1878, sometimes termed the gill septum hypothesis and it consisted of a series of rays, one ray large with the remaining small ones attached to the sides of the large one. Gegenbaur based this idea on the fin of Ceratodus and its similarity to the gill-region in Elasmobranchs. He suggested that the pentadactyl limb of modern tetrapods was derived from one side of the archipterygium. Thomas Huxley examined the idea and argued against it. He suggested that the tetrapod limb or cheiropterygium differed in its origins from that of the lungfish and that the two may have diversified from a true ancestral archipterygium. An alternate origin for tetrapod limbs was identified in the lateral fins by Francis Balfour. These were followed by several other modified hypotheses. Although the idea of the archipterygium is outdated, it was one of the first major applications of evolutionary morphology and development.

== See also ==
- Limb development
