= Friedreich's sign =

- Differential diagnosis: constrictive pericarditis

In medicine, Friedreich's sign is the exaggerated drop in diastolic central venous pressure seen in constrictive pericarditis (particularly with a stiff calcified pericardium) and manifested as abrupt collapse of the neck veins or marked descent of the central venous pressure waveform. The normal jugular venous waveform contains two descents, x and y. The x descent, which corresponds to the combination of right atrial relaxation and depression of the atrial floor during ventricular contraction, is normally dominant. The y descent occurs as a result of passive ventricular filling during early diastole and is usually absent in patients with tamponade. In constrictive pericarditis, the characteristic sharp and deep y descent reflects rapid filling in early diastole which occurs when the unyielding pericardium elevates atrial pressure and limits ventricular filling to the early diastolic period. Friedreich's diastolic collapse of the cervical veins, describes a sharp and deep y descent of the jugular venous waveform. It can be a clue to the diagnosis of constrictive pericarditis.

The sign is named after Nikolaus Friedreich.
