= Johann Baptist Friedreich =

German forensic pathologist and psychiatrist

Johann Baptist Friedreich (19 April 1796, in Würzburg – 19 January 1862, in Würzburg) was a German forensic physician and psychiatrist. He was a prominent member of the so-called "somatic school" of psychiatry in Germany. He was the son of physician Nicolaus Anton Friedreich (1761–1836), and the father of pathologist Nikolaus Friedreich (1825–1882).

He studied medicine at the University of Würzburg, where in 1820 he obtained his habilitation. In 1830 he was named a professor of physiology at the university, however in 1832, along with physician Johann Lukas Schönlein and surgeon Cajetan von Textor, he was removed from his post for political reasons. He then worked as a court physician in Weißenburg, later performing similar duties in Straubing, Ansbach and finally in Erlangen, where in 1850 he became an honorary professor of forensic medicine.

Friedreich is cited by multiple sources as having provided an especially early medical description of transsexuality. In particular, they note his 1829 work, Θήλεια νοῦσος; historisches Fragment, within the Magazin für philosophische, medizinische, und gerichtliche Seelenkunde (and its later 1830 republication as part of his Versuch einer Literärgeschichte der Pathologie und Therapie der psychischen Krankheiten).

== Selected works ==
- Versuch einer Literärgeschichte der Pathologie und Therapie der psychischen Krankheiten, 1830 – Essay on a literary history of the pathology and treatment of mental illness.
- Systematische Literatur der ärztlichen und gerichtlichen Psychologie, 1832 – Systematic literature of medical and judicial psychology.
- Historisch-kritische Darstellung der Theorien über das Wesen und den Sitz der psychischen Krankheiten, 1836 – Historical-critical presentation of theories on the nature and location of mental illness.
- System der gerichtlichen Psychologie, 1842 – System of judicial psychology.
- Zur Bibel. Naturhistorische, anthropologische und medicinische Fragmente, 1848 – The Bible; natural history, anthropological and medicinal fragments.
- Die realien in der Jliade und Odyssee, 1851 – Realities in the Iliad and Odyssey.
- Die symbolik und mythologie der natur, 1859 – The symbolism and mythology of nature.
- Geschichte des Räthsels, 1860 – History of the Riddle.
