= Hermann Braus =

German anatomist (1868–1924)

Hermann Braus (15 August 1868 – 28 November 1924) was a German anatomist who worked as a professor of comparative zoology at the University of Heidelberg and of anatomy at the University of Würzburg. He was involved in studies on the evolution of the tetrapod limb and pioneered techniques for visualization in anatomical studies.

== Life and work ==
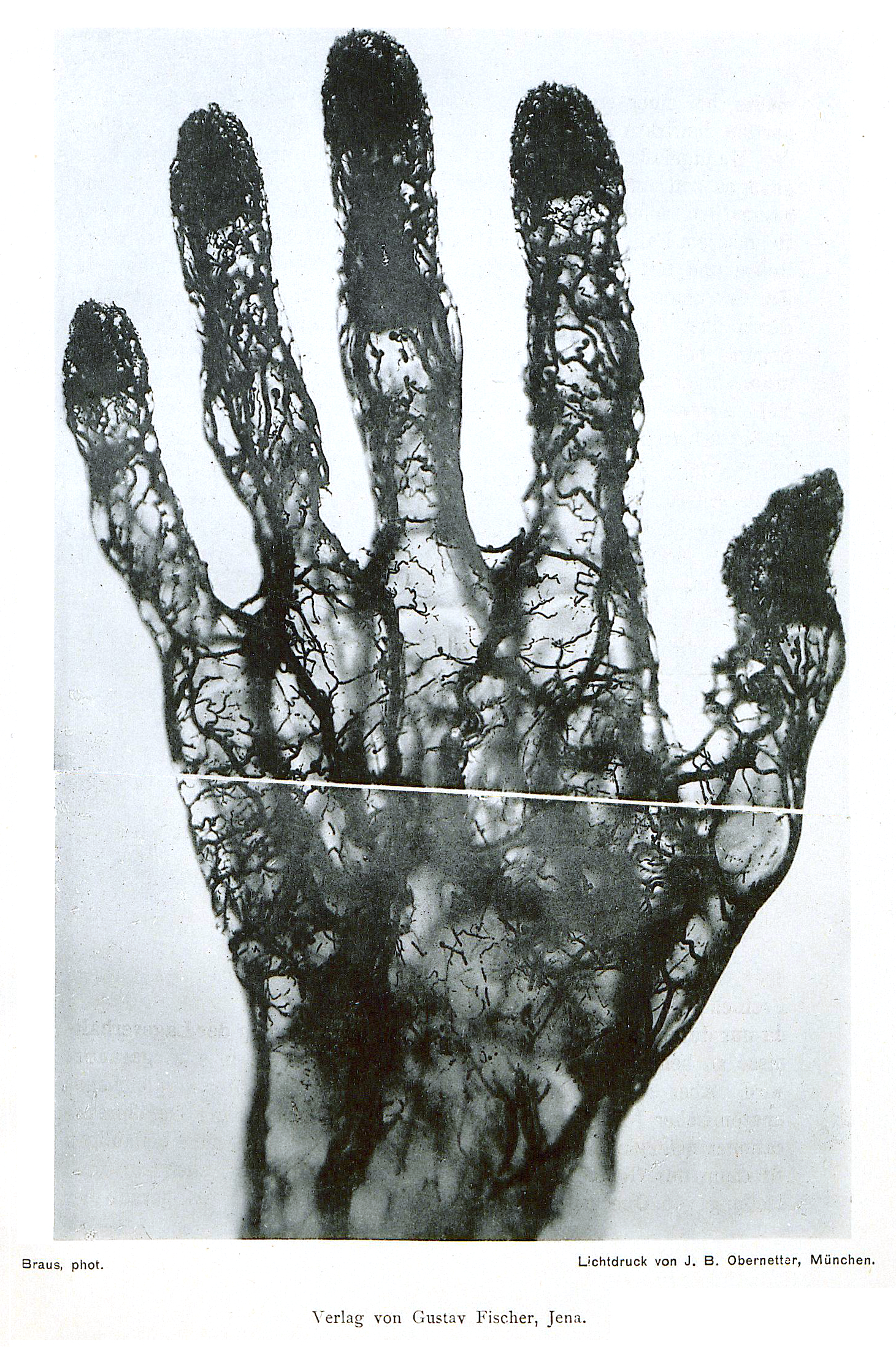
An X-ray image of the blood vessels of the hand made using mercury injection, 1896

Braus was born at Burscheid near Aachen to Bertha Ernestine and Otto Braus. He studied natural science at the University of Bonn and then went to study medicine at the University of Jena. After receiving a degree, he joined the University of Jena and worked on the anatomy collections. He collaborated with Carl Zeiss to improve microscopy for use in physiological and zoological studies. He began to study the nervous system of fish and wrote his dissertation on the topic in 1892 titled "Über die Rami ventrales der vorderen Spinalnerven einiger Selachier". Braus challenged the then reigning idea that muscle buds developed into skeletal elements in fishes. His studies of rays however showed that the skeleton and muscle developed independently. Braus was influenced by Max Fürbringer and married the latter's daughter, Elizabeth. Braus moved to Würzburg as a professor in 1899 but moved to Heidelberg after the retirement of Carl Gegenbaur, working again under Fürbringer. Braus became the head after Fürbringer retired. Braus worked on anatomy, and introduced new dissection and study techniques including the use of mercury injections followed by X-ray photography to study blood vessels. One of his students was Marie Kaufmann-Wolf (1877-1922). He published a two volume work on human anatomy in 1921.

Braus moved to Würzburg in 1921 as an anatomist. He died from renal failure in 1924.
