= VA conduction =

Phenomenon in conduction in the heart

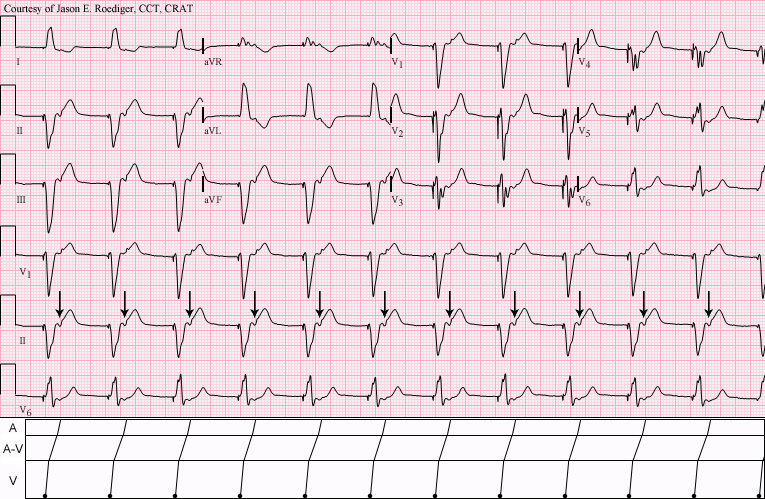
Ventricular pacemaker with 1:1 retrograde ventriculoatrial (V-A) conduction to the atria (arrows).

VA conduction, also named Ventriculoatrial conduction and sometimes referred to as Retrograde conduction, is the conduction backward phenomena in the heart, where the conduction comes from the ventricles or from the AV node into and through the atria.

Retrograde VA conduction results in many different symptoms, primarily those symptoms result from the delayed, nonphysiologic timing of atrial contraction in relation to ventricular contraction.
