= Restrictive cardiomyopathy =

- Other names: Obliterative cardiomyopathy, infiltrative cardiomyopathy, constrictive cardiomyopathy
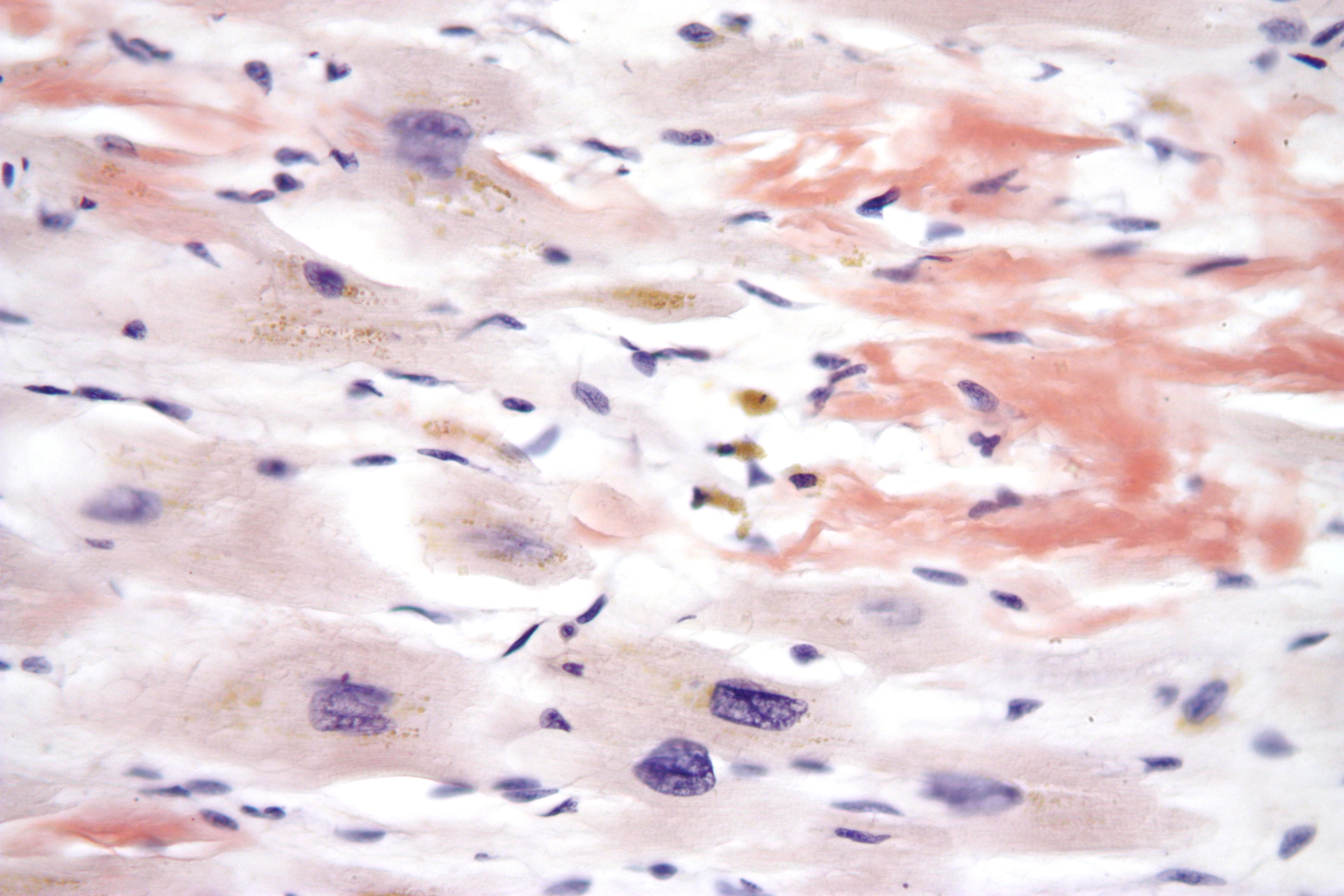
- Micrograph of cardiac amyloidosis, a cause of restrictive cardiomyopathy. Congo red stain.
- Specialty: Cardiology

Restrictive cardiomyopathy (RCM) is a form of cardiomyopathy in which the walls of the heart are rigid (but not thickened). Thus the heart is restricted from stretching and filling with blood properly. It is the least common of the three original subtypes of cardiomyopathy: hypertrophic, dilated, and restrictive.

It should not be confused with constrictive pericarditis, a disease which presents similarly but is very different in treatment and prognosis.

== Signs and symptoms ==
Untreated hearts with RCM often develop the following characteristics:

- M or W configuration in an invasive hemodynamic pressure tracing of the RA
- Square root sign of part of the invasive hemodynamic pressure tracing Of The LV
- Biatrial enlargement
- Thickened LV walls (with normal chamber size)
- Thickened RV free wall (with normal chamber size)
- Elevated right atrial pressure (>12mmHg),
- Moderate pulmonary hypertension,
- Normal systolic function,
- Poor diastolic function, typically Grade III - IV Diastolic heart failure.

Those affected by RCM will experience decreased exercise tolerance, fatigue, jugular venous distention, peripheral edema, and ascites. Arrhythmias and conduction blocks are common.

== Causes ==
RCM can be caused by genetic or non-genetic factors. Thus it is possible to divide the causes into primary and secondary. The common modern organization is into Infiltrative, storage diseases, non-infiltrative, and endomyocardial etiologies:

- Genetic
  - DES (desmin)
  - CRYAB (alpha B Crystallin, HSPB5)
  - FLNC (filamin C)
- Infiltrative
  - Amyloidosis
  - Sarcoidosis
  - Primary hyperoxaluria
- Storage diseases
  - Fabry disease
  - Gaucher disease
  - Hereditary hemochromatosis
  - Glycogen storage disease
  - Mucopolysaccharidosis type I (Hurler syndrome)
  - Mucopolysaccharidosis type II (Hunter syndrome)
  - Niemann-Pick disease
- Non-infiltrative
  - Idiopathic
  - Diabetic cardiomyopathy
  - Scleroderma
  - Myofibrillar myopathies
  - Pseudoxanthoma elasticum
  - Sarcomeric protein disorders
  - Werner's syndrome
- Endomyocardial
  - Carcinoid heart disease
  - Endomyocardial fibrosis
  - Idiopathic
  - Hypereosinophilic syndrome
  - Chronic eosinophilic leukemia
  - Drugs (anthracyclines, serotonin, methysergide, ergotamine, mercurial agents, busulfan)
  - Endocardial fibroelastosis
  - Consequence of cancer or cancer therapy
  - Metastatic cancer
  - Radiation

The most common cause of restrictive cardiomyopathy is amyloidosis.

== Mechanism ==
Rhythmicity and contractility of the heart may be normal, but the stiff walls of the heart chambers (atria and ventricles) keep them from adequately filling, reducing preload and end-diastolic volume. Thus, blood flow is reduced, and blood volume that would normally enter the heart is backed up in the circulatory system. In time, restrictive cardiomyopathy patients develop diastolic dysfunction and eventually heart failure.

== Diagnosis ==
Diagnosis is typically made via echocardiography. Patients will demonstrate normal systolic function, diastolic dysfunction, and a restrictive filling pattern. 2-dimensional and Doppler studies are necessary to distinguish RCM from constrictive pericarditis. If a patient has restrictive cardiomyopathy, the Doppler study should present poorly maintained ventricular filling on the E-wave and little to no late ventricular filling on the A-wave leading to the dip and plateau pattern of the early diastolic pressure marks seen on the ECG. Troponin T, B-type natriuretic peptide (BNP), and pro-DNP biomarkers can also help diagnose RCM. Cardiac MRI and transvenous endomyocardial biopsy may also be necessary in some cases. Reduced QRS voltage on EKG may be an indicator of amyloidosis-induced restrictive cardiomyopathy.

== Treatment ==
Treatment of restrictive cardiomyopathy should focus on management of causative conditions (for example, using corticosteroids if the cause is sarcoidosis), and slowing the progression of cardiomyopathy. Salt-restriction, diuretics, angiotensin-converting enzyme inhibitors, and anticoagulation may be indicated for managing restrictive cardiomyopathy. As a consequence of reduced blood flow through the heart, there is an elevation in filling pressures, aimed at sustaining optimal blood circulation throughout the body. However, the excessive use of diuretics may lead to inadequate blood perfusion in body tissues and, consequently, tissue hypoperfusion due to a reduction in overall blood volume.

Calcium channel blockers are generally contraindicated due to their negative inotropic effect, particularly in cardiomyopathy caused by amyloidosis. Digoxin, calcium channel blocking drugs and beta-adrenergic blocking agents provide little benefit, except in the subgroup of restrictive cardiomyopathy with atrial fibrillation. Vasodilators are also typically ineffective because systolic function is usually preserved in cases of RCM.

Heart failure resulting from restrictive cardiomyopathy will usually eventually have to be treated by cardiac transplantation or left ventricular assist device.

== Epidemiology ==
Endomyocardial fibrosis is generally limited to the tropics and sub-saharan Africa. The highest incidence of death caused by cardiac sarcoidosis is found in Japan.
