= Tricuspid valve stenosis =

Type of valvular heart disease

- Specialty: Cardiology

Tricuspid valve stenosis is a valvular heart disease that narrows the opening of the heart's tricuspid valve. It is a relatively rare condition that causes stenosis (increased restriction of blood flow through the valve).

== Cause ==
Causes of tricuspid valve stenosis are:

- Rheumatic disease
- Carcinoid syndrome
- Pacemaker leads (complication)

== Diagnosis ==
A mild diastolic murmur can be heard during auscultation caused by the blood flow through the stenotic valve. It is best heard over the left sternal border with rumbling character and tricuspid opening snap with wide-splitting S2. The diagnosis will typically be confirmed by an echocardiograph, which will also allow the physician to assess its severity.

== Treatment ==
Tricuspid valve stenosis itself usually does not require treatment. If stenosis is mild, monitoring the condition closely suffices. However, severe stenosis, or damage to other valves in the heart, may require surgical repair or replacement.

The treatment is usually by surgery (tricuspid valve replacement) or percutaneous balloon valvuloplasty. The resultant tricuspid regurgitation from percutaneous treatment is better tolerated than the insufficiency occurring during mitral valvuloplasty.

== See also ==
- Echocardiography
- Tricuspid valve
