= Postpericardiotomy syndrome =

Complications resulting from surgical incision of the pericardium

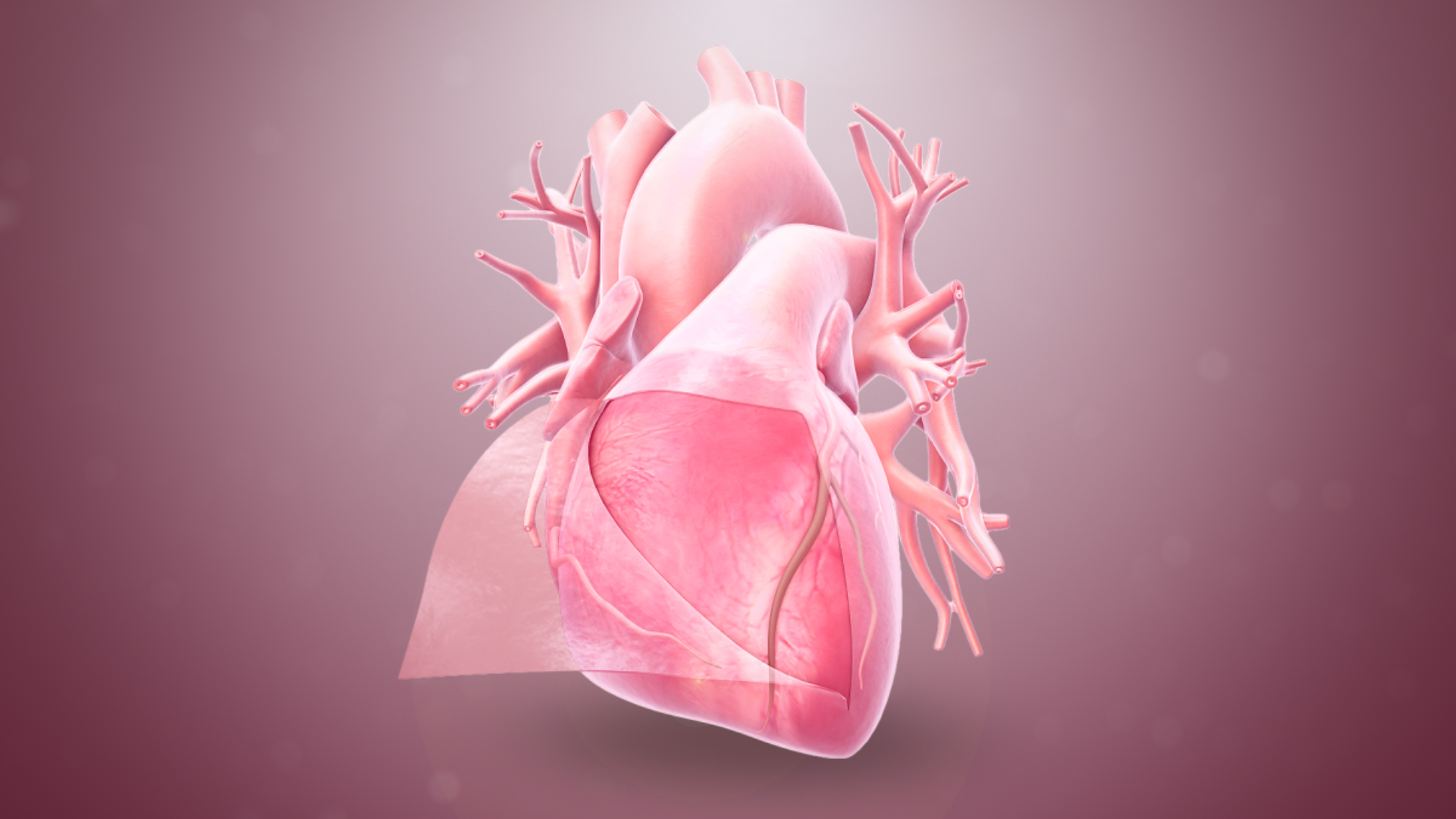
- A 3D still showing the pericardium layer.
- Specialty: Cardiology/immunology

Postpericardiotomy syndrome (PPS) is an immune phenomenon that occurs days to months (usually 1–6 weeks) after surgical incision of the pericardium (membranes encapsulating the human heart). PPS can also be caused after a trauma, a puncture of the cardiac or pleural structures (such as a bullet or stab wound), after percutaneous coronary intervention (such as stent placement after a myocardial infarction or heart attack), or due to pacemaker or pacemaker wire placement.

== Signs and symptoms ==
The typical signs of post-pericardiotomy syndrome include fever, pleuritis (with possible pleural effusion), pericarditis (with possible pericardial effusion), occasional but rare pulmonary infiltrates, and fatigue. Cough, pleuritic or retrosternal chest pain, joint pain and decreased oxygen saturation can also be seen in some cases.

Other signs include arthritis, together with petechiae on the skin and palate.

=== Complications ===
Complications include pericarditis, pericardial effusion, pleuritis, pulmonary infiltration, and very rarely pericardial tamponade. Of these cardiac tamponade is the most life-threatening complication. The pericardial fluid increases intra-pericardial pressure therefore preventing complete expansion of the atria and the ventricles upon the diastole. This causes equilibration of the pressure in all four heart chambers, and results in the common findings of the tamponade which are pulsus paradoxus, Beck's triad of hypotension, muffled heart sounds, and raised jugular venous pressure, as well as EKG or Holter monitor findings such as electrical alternans. Physically the patients who progress to severe pericardial tamponade obtundate, become mentally altered, and lethargic. If left untreated, severe decrease in cardiac output, vascular collapse, and hypoperfusion of body including the brain results in death.

== Pathogenesis ==
The cause is believed to be an autoimmune response against damaged cardiac tissue. This is supported by excellent response to immunosuppressive (steroid) therapy.

This condition is a febrile illness caused by immune attack of the pleura and the pericardium. Possible cell mediated immunity led by Helper T-cells and Cytotoxic T-cells is postulated to be important in the pathogenesis of this condition. There is also possibility of anti-cardiac antibodies created idiopathically, or due to concurrent cross-reactivity of the antibodies produced against viral antigens, however the latter assumption is not fool-proof or completely reliable due to conflicting studies.

== Diagnosis ==
A chest X-ray might depict pleural effusion, pulmonary infiltration, or pericardial effusion.

During medical doctor examination, a pericardial friction rub can be auscultated indicating pericarditis. Auscultation of the lungs can show crackles indicating pulmonary infiltration, and there can be retrosternal/pleuritic chest pain worse on inspiration (breathing in). Patient can also depict sweating (diaphoresis) and agitation or anxiety.

== Treatment ==
=== Colchicine ===
Colchicine has been used effectively to prevent pericarditis, and inflammation that follows surgery of the pericardium. Although no current drug on the market prevents post-pericardiotomy syndrome, colchicine seems to provide an effective and safe way to treat pericarditis by reducing inflammation. Colchicine is a natural product extracted from plants, and is a secondary metabolite (an organic compound not directly related to growth and development in an organism).

Colchicine interferes with the inflammatory process by altering several important steps in the pathway. Microtubules are structural components of the cytoskeleton that lengthen and shrink for important cell functions. Colchicine binds to β- tubulin and forms tubulin-colchicine complexes. These complexes interfere with microtubule formation microtubules. Low doses of colchicine can inhibit the formation of microtubules, while high doses depolymerize or break down a polymer to a monomer. Therefore, any process involving cytoskeleton change, including mitosis and motility of white blood cells, is highly impacted.

Microtubule disruption decreases neutrophil adhesion, an important step for inflammation. Neutrophils are recruited to the target location of inflammation via signals from the endothelium where they adhere and play a role in the inflammatory response. Colchicine diminishes neutrophil adhesion by decreasing expression of selectins, a family of cell adhesion molecules. In addition, colchicine prevents the movement and secretion of intercellular granules, substances, proinflammatory enzymes from neutrophils, thus making a significant impact on inflammatory processes within the body. The high concentration of colchicine in neutrophils, sixteen times greater compared the plasma levels, can account for the positive therapeutic effects.

Many mediators are altered to assist neutrophils during inflammation, including the monokine tumor necrosis factor-alpha (TNFα). Cytokines help stimulate the acute phase reaction in response to inflammation. Colchicine inhibits macrophage production of TNFα, leading to the interference between TNFα and neutrophil interaction. There are many more effects of colchicine that are currently under research, and some aspects of this metabolite are not fully understood.

There was great hope that colchicine could be a primary preventive measure in treating post-pericardiotomy syndrome due to its anti-inflammatory effects. In the COPPS-2 trial, however, perioperative use of colchicine compared with placebo reduced the incidence of postpericardiotomy syndrome but not of postoperative AF or postoperative pericardial/pleural effusion. The increased risk of gastrointestinal adverse effects reduced the potential benefits of colchicine in this setting. Thus colchicine is not likely going to be the ideal way to prevent this problem.

== Epidemiology ==
More common in children and often common in patients receiving cardiac operations that involve opening the pericardium. CABG surgery is a common culprit.

== See also ==
- Skin lesion
- Dressler syndrome
