= Resuscitation =

Emergency correction of acute critical physiological disorders

Resuscitation is the process of correcting physiological disorders (such as lack of breathing or heartbeat) in an acutely ill patient. It is an important part of intensive care medicine, anesthesiology, trauma surgery and emergency medicine. Well-known examples are cardiopulmonary resuscitation and mouth-to-mouth resuscitation.

Adequate resuscitation and end-organ perfusion is best indicated by urine output of 0.5-1 mL/kg/h. For the average adult male weighing ~70 kg this would mean a urine output of 35 mL/h (70 x 0.5 = 35 mL/h). Heart rate, mental status, and capillary refill may be affected by underlying disease processes and are thus less reliable markers for adequate resuscitation.

== Documentation ==
For subsequent treatment, resuscitations have to be properly recorded. One example is trauma care. Even though there is a strong expansion of electronic health records, within the healthcare industry, resuscitation documentation is still often handwritten, increasing the risk of incomplete documentation. Novel options like tablet-based solutions help to digitalize this process. For improved documentation quality, future solutions have to be accepted by clinicians and well-integrated into their workflows.

== Variables ==
System	Example causes		Biomarker		Treatment
Hypoperfusion (Circulatory shock)	Haemorrhagic shock	Hypovolemia (Hypovolemic shock)	Intravascular volume status (Preload)	Heart rate (Tachycardia) / Systolic blood pressure (Hypotension) / Decreased urine output	Intravenous fluid / Intraosseous infusion / Blood transfusion with packed red blood cells
Hypoperfusion (Circulatory shock)	Cardiogenic shock		Cardiac output	Heart rate (Tachycardia) / Systolic blood pressure (Hypotension) / Decreased urine output	Positive inotropic agents / Chronotropes
Hypoperfusion (Circulatory shock)	Distributive shock	Sepsis (Septic shock)	Vascular permeability	Heart rate (Tachycardia) / Systolic blood pressure (Hypotension) / Decreased urine output	Vasopressors
Hypoperfusion (Circulatory shock)	Distributive shock	Neurogenic shock	Total peripheral resistance	Heart rate (Tachycardia) / Systolic blood pressure (Hypotension) / Decreased urine output	Vasopressors
Hypoperfusion (Circulatory shock)	Obstructive shock	Cardiac tamponade	Beck's triad		Pericardiocentesis/Thoracotomy with pericardial window
Hypoperfusion (Circulatory shock)	Obstructive shock	Tension pneumothorax			Thoracentesis/Chest drain
Hypoperfusion (Circulatory shock)	Obstructive shock	Pulmonary embolism			Thrombolysis/Embolectomy
Acid–base imbalance	Acidosis		pH		Sodium bicarbonate
Acid–base imbalance	Alkalosis		pH		Interventional/Supportive
Gas exchange (Respiratory failure)	Hypercapnia		PaCO2		Interventional/Supportive
Gas exchange (Respiratory failure)	Hypoxia		PaO2		Oxygen therapy
Altered level of consciousness	Coma	Narcosis (Drug overdose) / Stroke (Intracranial hemorrhage)	Glasgow Coma Scale		Interventional/Supportive
Blood sugar regulation	Hyperglycemia		Blood sugar		Insulin
Blood sugar regulation	Hypoglycemia		Blood sugar		Glucose
Electrolyte imbalance	Hyperkalemia		Serum potassium		Calcium chloride/Calcium diglutamate, others
Electrolyte imbalance	Hypokalemia		Serum potassium		Potassium
Coagulopathy	Hypocoagulability		Coagulation screen		Fresh frozen plasma/Cryoprecipitate/Platelets

== See also ==
- Advanced life support – Life-saving protocols
- Advanced cardiac life support – Emergency medical care
- Advanced trauma life support – American medical training program
- Cardiopulmonary resuscitation – Emergency procedure after sudden cardiac arrest
- Emergency Preservation and Resuscitation – Experimental emergency medicine procedure
- Fluid replacement, also known as Fluid resuscitation – Medical practice of replenishing bodily fluid
- Hs and Ts – Mnemonic
- Mouth-to-mouth resuscitation – Artificial ventilation using exhaled air from the rescuer
- Neonatal resuscitation – Emergency medical procedure
- Pediatric advanced life support – American Heart Association course
