= Obstructive shock =

Insufficient blood flow due to physical obstruction

Obstructive Shock
- Specialty: Critical Care Medicine
- Causes: Tension pneumothorax; cardiac tamponade; Budd chiari syndrome; pulmonary embolism; abdominal compartment syndrome; severe aortic stenosis; constrictive pericarditis; SVC syndrome
- Diagnostic method: Thorough history and physical exam; EKG; echocardiogram; X-ray; CT angiogram
- Differential diagnosis: Cardiogenic shock; hypovolemic shock; distributive shock
- Treatment: Depends on the cause of the obstruction

Obstructive shock is one of the four types of shock, caused by a physical obstruction in the flow of blood. Obstruction can occur at the level of the great vessels or the heart itself. Causes include pulmonary embolism, cardiac tamponade, and tension pneumothorax. These are all life-threatening. Symptoms may include shortness of breath, weakness, or altered mental status. Low blood pressure and tachycardia are often seen in shock. Other symptoms depend on the underlying cause.

The physiology of obstructive shock is similar to cardiogenic shock. In both types, the heart's output of blood (cardiac output) is decreased. This causes a back-up of blood into the veins entering the right atrium. Jugular venous distension can be observed in the neck. This finding can be seen in obstructive and cardiogenic shock. With the decrease cardiac output, blood flow to vital tissues is decreased. Poor perfusion to organs leads to shock. Due to these similarities, some sources place obstructive shock under the category of cardiogenic shock.

However, it is important to distinguish between the two types, because treatment is different. In cardiogenic shock, the problem is in the function of the heart itself. In obstructive shock, the underlying problem is not the pump. Rather, the input into the heart (venous return) is decreased or the pressure against which the heart is pumping (afterload) is higher than normal. Treating the underlying cause can reverse the shock. For example, tension pneumothorax needs rapid needle decompression. This decreases the pressure in the chest. Blood flow to and from the heart is restored, and shock resolves.

== Signs and symptoms ==
As in all types of shock, low blood pressure is a key finding in patients with obstructive shock. In response to low blood pressure, heart rate increases. Shortness of breath, tachypnea, and hypoxia may be present. Because of poor blood flow to the tissues, patients may have cold extremities. Less blood to the kidneys and brain can cause decreased urine output and altered mental status, respectively.

Other signs may be seen depending on the underlying cause. For example, jugular venous distension is a significant finding in evaluating shock. This occurs in cardiogenic and obstructive shock. This is not observed in the other two types of shock, hypovolemic and distributive. Some particular clinical findings are described below.

A classic finding of cardiac tamponade is Beck's triad. The triad includes hypotension, jugular vein distension, and muffled heart sounds. Kussmaul's sign and pulsus paradoxus may also be seen. Low-voltage QRS complexes and electrical alternans are signs on EKG. However, EKG may not show these findings and most often shows tachycardia.

Tension pneumothorax would have decreased breath sounds on the affected side. Tracheal deviation may also be present, shifted away from the affected side. Thus, a lung exam is important. Other findings may include decreased chest mobility and air underneath the skin (subcutaneous emphysema).

Pulmonary embolism similarly presents with shortness of breath and hypoxia. Chest pain worse with inspiration is frequently seen. Chest pain can also be similar to a heart attack. This is due to the right ventricular stress and ischemia that can occur in PE. Other symptoms are syncope and hemoptysis. DVT is a common cause. Thus, symptoms including leg pain, redness, and swelling can be present. The likelihood of pulmonary embolism can be evaluated through various criteria. The Wells score is often calculated. It gives points based on these symptoms and patient risk factors.

== Causes ==
Left-sided tension pneumothorax. Note the area without lung markings which is air in the pleural space. Also note the tracheal and mediastinal shift from the patient's left to right.

Causes include any obstruction of blood flow to and from the heart. There are multiple, including pulmonary embolism, cardiac tamponade, and tension pneumothorax. Other causes include abdominal compartment syndrome, Hiatal hernia, severe aortic valve stenosis, and disorders of the aorta. Constrictive pericarditis is a rare cause. Masses can grow to press on major blood vessels causing shock.

=== Tension pneumothorax ===
A pneumothorax occurs when air collects in the pleural space around the lungs. Normally, this space has negative pressure to allow the lung to fill. Pressure increases as more air enters this space. The lung collapses, impairing normal breathing. Surrounding structures may also shift. When severe enough to cause these shifts and hypotension, it is called a tension pneumothorax. This is life-threatening. The increased pressure inside the chest can compress the heart and lead to a collapse of the blood vessels that drain to the heart. The veins supplying the heart are compressed, in turn decreasing venous return. With the heart unable to fill, cardiac output drops. Hypotension and shock ensue. If not rapidly treated, it can lead to cardiac arrest and death.

=== Pulmonary embolism ===
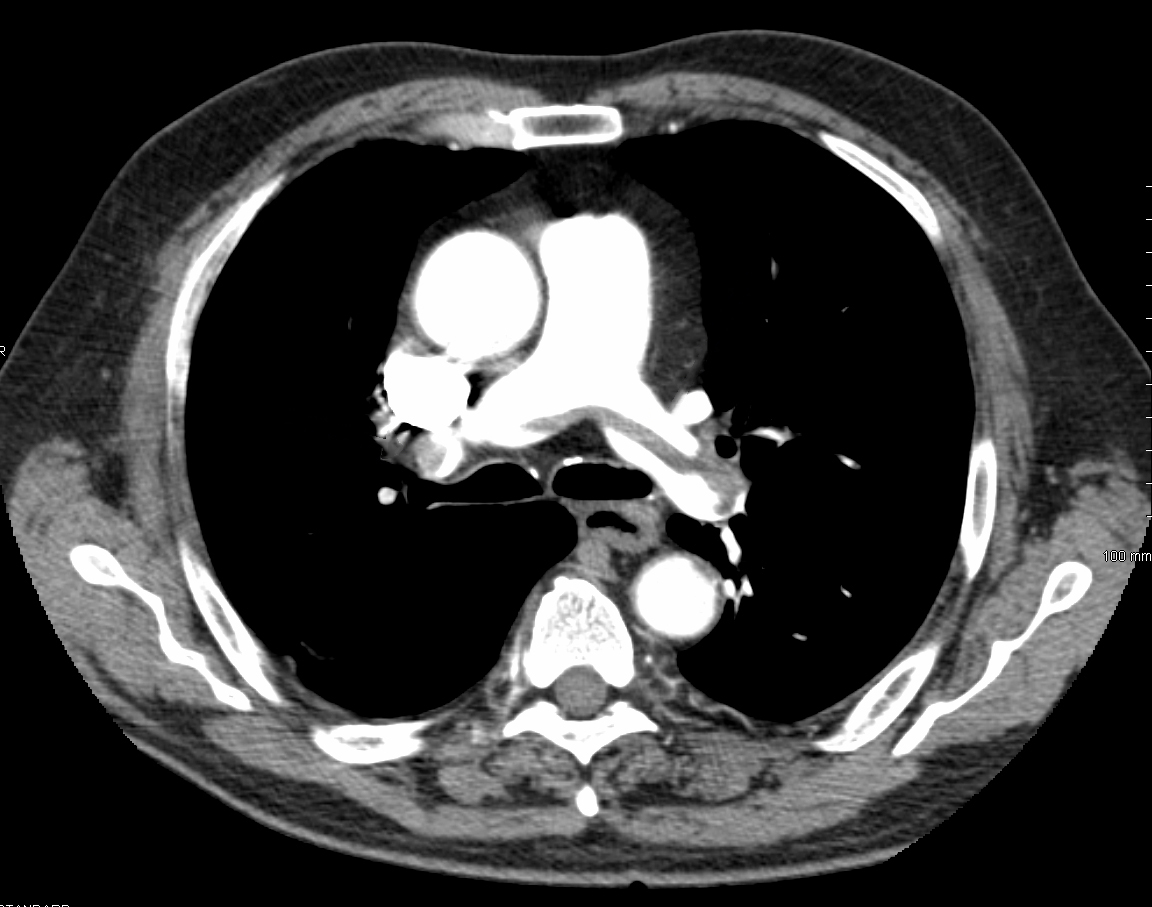
"Saddle" embolism on CT. The filling defect in the pulmonary artery is the clot.

A pulmonary embolism (PE) is an obstruction of the pulmonary arteries. Deaths from PE have been estimated at ~100,000 per year in the United States. However, this may be higher in recent years. Most often, the obstruction is a blood clot that traveled from elsewhere in the body. Most commonly, this is from a deep vein thrombosis (DVT) in the legs or pelvis. Risk factors are conditions that increase the risk of clotting. This includes genetic (factor V Leiden) and acquired conditions (cancer). Trauma, surgery, and prolonged bed-rest are common risks. COVID-19 is a recent risk factor.

This obstruction increases the pulmonary vascular resistance. If large enough, the clot increases the load on the right side of the heart. The right ventricle must work harder to pump blood to the lungs. With back-up of blood, the right ventricle can begin to dilate. Right heart failure can ensue, leading to shock and death.

A PE is considered "massive" when it causes hypotension or shock. A submassive PE causes right heart dysfunction without hypotension.

=== Cardiac tamponade ===
Echocardiogram of cardiac tamponade. Fluid surrounding the heart impairs proper filling. This swinging of the heart causes electrical alternans seen on EKG.

A pericardial effusion is fluid in the pericardial sac. When large enough, the pressure compresses the heart. This causes shock by preventing the heart from filling with blood. This is called cardiac tamponade. The chambers of the heart can collapse from this pressure. The right heart has thinner walls and collapses more easily. With less venous return, cardiac output decreases. The lack of blood flow to vital organs can cause death.

Whether an effusion causes tamponade depends on the amount of fluid and how long it took to accumulate. When fluid collects slowly, the pericardium can stretch. Thus, a chronic effusion can be as large as 1 liter. Acute effusions can cause tamponade when small because the tissue does not have time to stretch.

== Diagnosis ==
Rapid evaluation of shock is essential given its life-threatening nature. Diagnosis requires a thorough history, physical exam, and additional tests. One must also consider the possibility of multiple types of shock being present. For example, a trauma patient may be hypovolemic from blood loss. This patient could also have tension pneumothorax due to trauma to the chest.

Vital signs in obstructive shock may show hypotension, tachycardia, and/or hypoxia. A physical exam include be thorough, including jugular vein exam, cardiac and lung exams, and assessing skin tone and temperature. Response to fluids may aid in diagnosis. Labs including a metabolic panel can assess electrolytes and kidney and liver function. Lactic acid rises due to poor tissue perfusion. This may even be an initial sign of shock and rise before blood pressure decreases. Lactic acid should lower with appropriate treatment of shock. EKG should also be performed. Tachycardia is often present, but other specific findings may be present based on the underlying cause.

At the bedside, point-of-care echocardiography should be used. This is non-invasive and can help diagnose the four types of shock. Echocardiography can look for ventricular dysfunction, effusions, or valve dysfunction. Measurement of the vena cava during the breathing cycle can help assess volume status. A point-of-care echocardiogram can also assess for causes of obstructive shock. The vena cava would be dilated due to the obstruction. In pulmonary embolism, the right ventricle will be dilated. Other findings include paradoxical septal motion or clots in the right heart or pulmonary artery. Echocardiography can assess for pericardial effusion. In tamponade, collapse of the right atrium and ventricle would be seen due to pressure in the pericardial sac.

A chest X-ray can rapidly identify a pneumothorax, seen as absence of lung markings. Ultrasound can show the lack of lung sliding. However, imaging should not delay treatment. CT angiography is the standard of diagnosis of pulmonary embolism. Clots appear in the vasculature as filling defects.

== Treatment ==
In any type of shock, rapid treatment is essential. Delays in therapy increase the risk of mortality. This is often done as diagnostic assessment is still occurring. Resuscitation addresses the ABC's - airway, breathing, and circulation. Supplemental oxygen is given, and intubation is performed if indicated. Intravenous fluids can increase blood pressure and maintain blood flow to organs.

However, fluids should be given with caution. Too much fluid can cause overload and pulmonary edema. In some cases, fluids may be beneficial. Fluids can improve venous return. For example, tamponade prevents normal cardiac filling due to pressure compressing the heart. In this case, giving fluids can improve right heart filling. However, in other causes of obstructive shock, too much fluid can worsen cardiac output. Thus, fluid therapy should be monitored closely.

After these stabilizing measures, further treatment depends on the cause. Treatment of the underlying condition can quickly resolve the shock. For tension pneumothorax, needle decompression should be done immediately. A chest tube is also inserted. Cardiac tamponade is treated through needle or surgical decompression. Needle pericardiocentesis can be done at the bedside. This is often the preferred therapy. A catheter may be placed for continued drainage. If these methods are not effective, surgery may be needed. Pericardial window is a surgery that is particularly in cases of cancer.

Massive pulmonary embolism requires thrombolysis or embolectomy. Thrombolysis can be systemic via IV alteplase (tPA) or catheter-directed. tPA works to break up the clot. A major risk of tPA is bleeding. Thus, patients must be assessed for their risk of bleeding and contraindications. Catheter-directed therapy involves giving tPA locally in the pulmonary artery. It can also fragment and remove the clot itself (embolectomy). This local therapy has a lower risk of bleeding. Surgical embolectomy is a more invasive treatment, associated with 10-20% surgical mortality risk.
