= Hemopericardium =

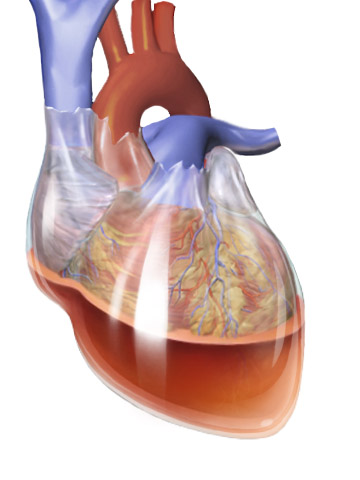
- Specialty: Emergency medicine

Hemopericardium refers to blood in the pericardial sac of the heart. It is clinically similar to a pericardial effusion, and, depending on the volume and rapidity with which it develops, may cause cardiac tamponade.

The condition can be caused by full-thickness necrosis (death) of the myocardium (heart muscle) after myocardial infarction, chest trauma, and by over-prescription of anticoagulants. Other causes include ruptured aneurysm of sinus of Valsalva and other aneurysms of the aortic arch.

Hemopericardium can be diagnosed with a chest X-ray or a chest ultrasound, and is most commonly treated with pericardiocentesis. While hemopericardium itself is not deadly, it can lead to cardiac tamponade, a condition that is fatal if left untreated.

== Symptoms and signs ==
Symptoms of hemopericardium often include difficulty breathing, abnormally rapid breathing, and fatigue, each of which can be a sign of a serious medical condition not limited to hemopericardium. In many cases, patients also report feeling chest pressure and have an abnormally elevated heart rate.

== Cause ==
Hemopericardium has been reported to result from various afflictions including chest trauma, free wall rupture after a myocardial infarction, bleeding into the pericardial sac following a type A aortic dissection, and as a complication of invasive cardiac procedures. Acute leukemia has also been reported as a cause of the condition. Several cases of hemopericardium have also been reported as a side-effect of anticoagulants.

== Mechanism ==
Hemopericardium is a condition that affects the cardiovascular system. It typically begins with blood accumulating in the pericardial sac posterior to the heart, and eventually expands to surround the entire heart. The fluid build-up then causes pressure within the pericardial sac to increase. If the pressure becomes greater than the intracardiac pressure of the heart, compression of the adjacent cardiac chambers can occur. This compression, called cardiac tamponade, is often associated with hemopericardium and can be fatal if not diagnosed and treated promptly. Early signs of this compression include right atrial inversion during ventricular systole followed by diastolic compression of the right ventricular outflow tract.

There have also been cases reported in which hemopericardium was noted as an initial manifestation of essential thrombocythemia.

== Diagnosis ==
Hemopericardium can be diagnosed using echocardiography, a cardiac ultrasound. Chest X-rays are also often taken when hemopericardium is suspected and would reveal an enlarged heart. Other observable signs include rapid heart rate, jugular venous distension, low blood pressure, and pulsus paradoxus.

== Treatment ==
When discovered, hemopericardium is usually treated by pericardiocentesis, a procedure wherein a needle is used to remove the fluid from the pericardial sac. This procedure typically utilizes an 8-cm, 18-gauge needle that is inserted between the xiphoid process and the left costal margin until it enters the pericardial sac, when it can then be used to drain the fluid from the sac. A catheter is often left in the pericardium to continue draining any remaining fluid after the initial procedure. The catheter can be removed when the hemopericardium no longer persists. The underlying causes of the condition, such as over-prescription of anticoagulants, must be addressed as well so that the hemopericardium does not return.

While hemopericardium itself is not fatal, it may lead to cardiac tamponade, which can be deadly if not treated promptly. One study found that cardiac tamponade was fatal in 13.3% of cases in which it was not caused by a malignant disease.

== Research ==
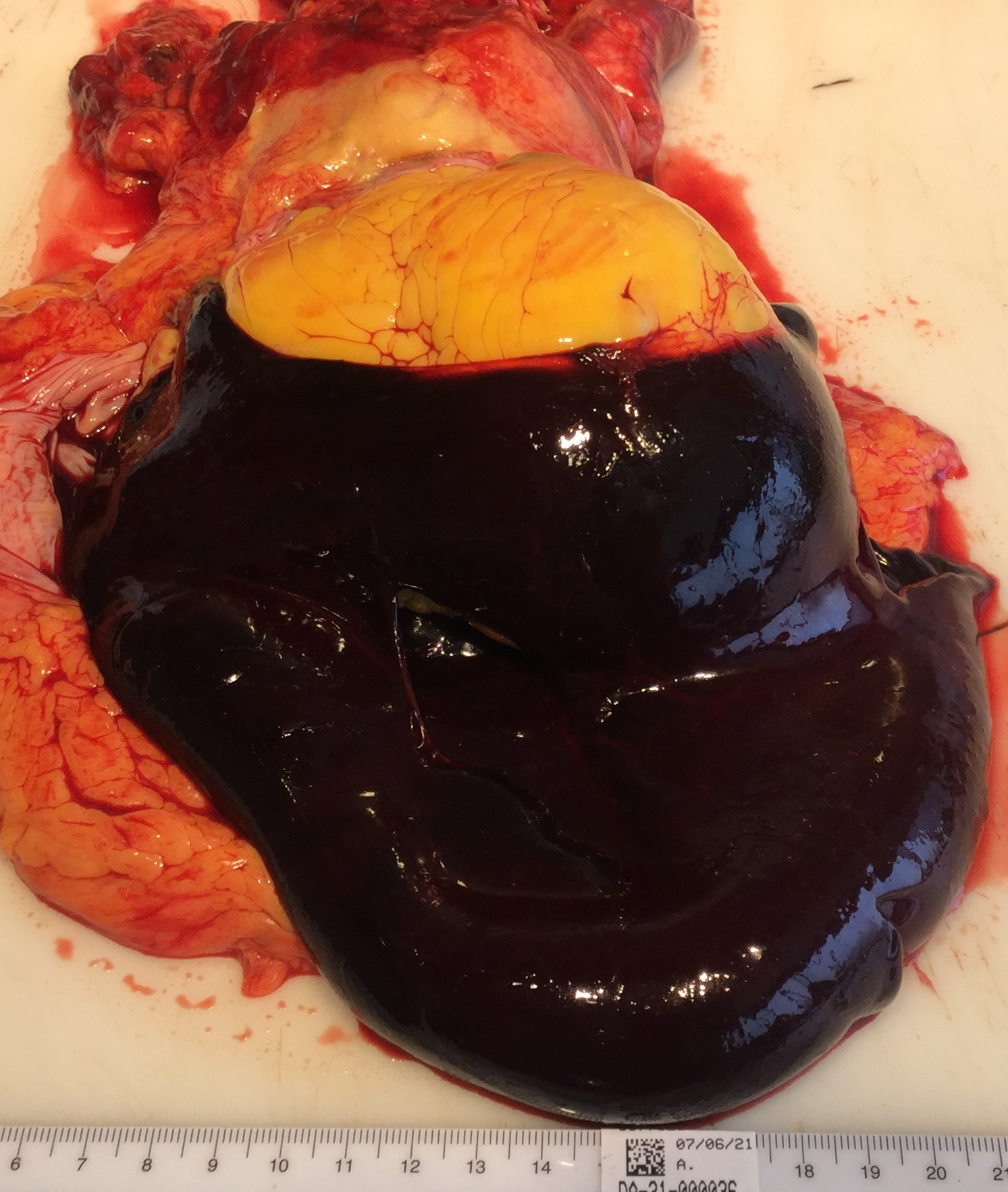
Gross pathology of hemopericardium, with clotted blood surrounding the heart (in this case appearing yellow due to epicardial fat).

Studies have shown that hemopericardium can occur spontaneously in people with essential thrombocythemia, although this is relatively rare. It is a more common occurrence in patients who have been over-prescribed anticoagulants. Regardless of the underlying cause of the hemopericardium, pericardiocentesis has shown to be the best treatment method for the condition.
