= Pericardial =

Pericardial can refer to:

- Pericardial sinus
- Pericardium
- Pericardial effusion
