= Pericardiectomy =

Partial or complete removal of the pericardium

- ICD-9-CM: 37.31
- MeSH: D010492

Pericardiectomy is the surgical removal of part or most of the pericardium. This operation is most commonly used to relieve constrictive pericarditis, or to remove a pericardium that is calcified and fibrous. It may also be used for severe or recurrent cases of pericardial effusion. Post-operative outcomes and mortality are significantly impacted by the disease it is used to treat.

== Uses ==
Pericardiectomy is used to treat constrictive pericarditis, which is caused by a variety of conditions. It is also used to treat recurring cases of pericardial effusion.

== Contra-indications ==
Pericardiectomy should not be used if more minor procedures are more appropriate, such as a pericardial window. Pericardiectomy may not be appropriate for patients who already have a poor prognosis, as its medical benefit is reduced. This is because pericardiectomy has a higher rate of complications and a higher mortality. More conservative treatment may use diuretics, digoxin, steroids, NSAIDs, or antibiotics to change cardiovascular physiology without treating the underlying pathology, which is appropriate for those not suitable for major surgery. Some patients may undergo conservative treatment for a number of months before pericardiectomy is considered truly necessary.

== Risks ==
Pericardiectomy can cause a number of cardiac issues, such as arrhythmia, low cardiac output syndrome, and myocardial infarction (in rare cases). There is some risk of damage to the pleural cavities around the lungs, which can lead to pneumonia, or pleural effusion. It also presents typical surgical risks, such as infection, anaesthesia complications, blood clots, and bleeding. There is a low risk of haemorrhage if the heart is perforated whilst removing the pericardium.

Outcomes after surgery depend significantly on the underlying cause of illness, and the function of the kidneys, left ventricle, and pulmonary arteries. Recovery from pericardial effusion treated with pericardiectomy is typically very good. However, its use for treating constrictive pericarditis has a fairly high mortality rate, initially between 5% and 15%. The 5-year survival rate is around 80%. The most common complication after surgery is reduced cardiac output, which occurs in between 14% and 28% of patients.

== Technique ==
Pericardiectomy takes place by removing the infected, fibrosed, or otherwise damaged pericardium. The procedure begins when the surgeon makes an incision in the skin over the breastbone and divides the breastbone to expose the pericardium, known as a median sternotomy. Alternatively, a larger incision known as a thoracotomy may be used. During the surgery, the surgeon will hold the pericardium, cut the top of this fibrous covering of the heart, drop it into the specimen bag, and re-cover the heart. The breastbone is then wired back together and the incision is closed, completing the procedure. When the portion of pericardium lying between the two phrenic nerves is excised, it is called total pericardiectomy. In cases where total pericardiectomy is not possible, subtotal pericardiectomy is performed or, in extreme cases, a cruciate incision on the pericardium is performed.

== Recovery ==
Heart function often recovers very quickly after pericardiectomy is performed, although the surgery itself can cause reduced cardiac output in the short term. After surgery, many patients will have a chest drain to remove pericardial fluid. Hospital recovery takes several days, with surgical suture removed after a week.

After pericardiectomy, the heart takes on a more rounded shape due to the lack of stretch with the diaphragm. This does not appear to cause any cardiac issues, but may be detected with echocardiography.

== See also ==
- List of surgeries by type
