= Dressler syndrome =

Medical effects resulting from injury to the pericardium

- Specialty: Cardiology

Dressler syndrome is a secondary form of pericarditis that occurs in the setting of injury to the heart or the pericardium (the outer lining of the heart). It consists of fever, pleuritic pain, pericarditis and/or pericardial effusion.

Dressler syndrome is also known as postmyocardial infarction syndrome and the term is sometimes used to refer to post-pericardiotomy pericarditis.

It was first characterized by William Dressler at Maimonides Medical Center in 1956.

It should not be confused with Dressler's syndrome of haemoglobinuria named for Lucas Dressler, who characterized it in 1854.

== Presentation ==
Dressler syndrome was historically a phenomenon complicating about 7% of myocardial infarctions, but in the era of percutaneous coronary intervention, it is very uncommon. The disease consists of persistent low-grade fever, chest pain (usually pleuritic), pericarditis (usually evidenced by a pericardial friction rub, chest pain worsening when recumbent, and diffuse ST elevation with PR segment depression), and/or pericardial effusion. The symptoms tend to occur 2–3 weeks after myocardial infarction but can also be delayed a few months. It tends to subside in a few days, and very rarely leads to pericardial tamponade. Elevated ESR is an objective but nonspecific laboratory finding.

== Causes ==
It is believed to result from an autoimmune inflammatory reaction to myocardial neo-antigens formed as a result of the MI. Similar pericarditis can be associated with any pericardiotomy or trauma to the pericardium or heart surgery which is called a postcardiotomy syndrome.

== Diagnosis ==
=== Differential diagnosis ===
Dressler syndrome needs to be differentiated from pulmonary embolism, another identifiable cause of pleuritic (and non-pleuritic) chest pain in people who have been hospitalized and/or undergone surgical procedures within the preceding weeks. ischaemic heart disease.

== Treatment ==
The treatment of Dressler syndrome is managed with NSAIDs such as aspirin, naproxen, and ibuprofen. Unless a patient is hemodynamically unstable, management is done in an outpatient setting (e.g. a clinic/office). Indomethacin (also an NSAID) is avoided because it can inhibit new collagen deposition, thus impairing the healing process for the infarcted region. In some resistant cases, corticosteroids can be used but are not preferred (avoided) in the first month due to the high frequency of impaired ventricular healing leading to an increased rate of ventricular rupture. Heparin should be avoided because it can lead to hemorrhage into the pericardial sac, leading to tamponade. The only time heparin could be used with pericarditis is with coexisting acute MI, in order to prevent further thrombus formation.

Some sources suggest that taking colchicine soon after surgery may help prevent Dressler syndrome.
