= Pericardial sinus =

Space of the pericardium

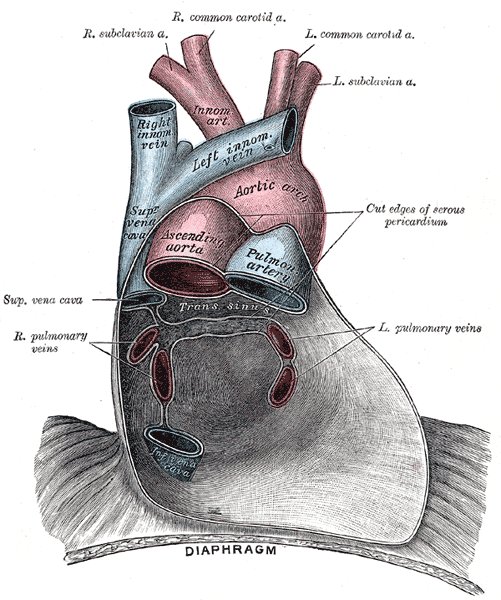
- Posterior wall of the pericardial sac, showing the lines of reflection of the serous pericardium on the great vessels. (Transverse sinus labeled at center. Oblique sinus not labeled, but visible inferior to transverse sinus between the right and left pulmonary veins)

Details

Identifiers
- Latin: sinus transversus pericardii
- TA98: A12.1.07.001
- TA2: 3349
- FMA: 77132

The pericardial sinuses are impressions in the pericardial sac formed between the points where great vessels enter it.

== Structure ==
There are three pericardial sinuses: superior, transverse and oblique.

- The superior sinus is anterior to the ascending aorta and the pulmonary trunk. It cannot be assessed in electrophysiology procedures.
- The oblique sinus is an inverted J-shaped reflection of the venae cavae and pulmonary veins. It lies behind the atria (particularly the left atrium), and in between left and right pulmonary veins.
- The transverse sinus is the tunnel-shaped passage posterior to the aorta and pulmonary trunk, and anterior to the superior vena cava. This sinus is clinically important because passing one end of clamp through the sinus, and the other end anterior to the aorta/pulmonary trunk will allow complete blockage of blood output. This is performed during some heart surgeries.

== Clinical significance ==
During pericardial effusion, fluid may build up in the pericardial sinuses. This may be diagnosed with transoesophageal echocardiography.
