= William Dressler (cardiologist) =

Polish-American cardiologist (1890–1969)

William Dressler (1890–1969) was a cardiologist born in Poland, who went on to become a Director of Cardiology at Maimonides Medical Center.

Dressler syndrome is named after him for discovering the condition in 1956.

The "Dressler beat", a type of QRS complex, is also named after him.
