= Electrical alternans =

- Electrical alternans, tachycardia, and low voltage in a person with a large pericardial effusion.
- Specialty: Cardiology

Electrical alternans is an electrocardiographic phenomenon of alternation of QRS complex amplitude or axis between beats and a possible wandering base-line. It can be seen in cardiac tamponade and severe pericardial effusion and is thought to be related to changes in the ventricular electrical axis due to fluid in the pericardium, as the heart essentially wobbles in the fluid filled pericardial sac. It can also be found in other conditions, such as bidirectional ventricular tachycardia from digoxin toxicity and atrioventricular tachycardia.

The echocardiogram of the heart demonstrated the characteristic swinging along with alternating voltage on the ECG.

== Causes ==
The two most common causes of electrical alternans are cardiac tamponade and pericardial effusion. In this case, the heart's pendulum-like motion and rotation from beat to beat, which the ECG electrodes detect as varying amplitudes, is what causes the classic ECG rhythm. In addition, electrical alternans can be observed in conduction and refractory changes in a variety of rhythms, including the ones previously mentioned, which causes the electrodes to detect a range of QRS amplitudes.

== See also ==
- Cardiac tamponade
- Electrocardiogram
