= Infrasternal angle =

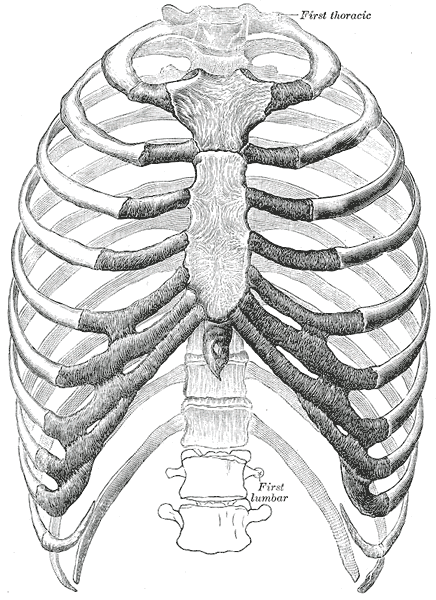
- The human rib cage.

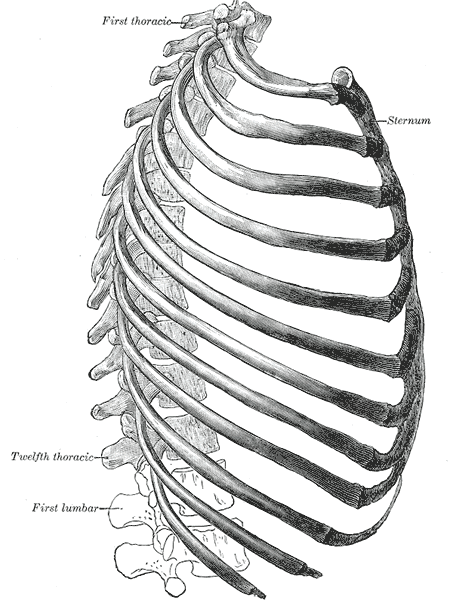
- The thorax from the right.

Details

Identifiers
- Latin: angulus infrasternalis
- TA98: A02.3.04.008
- TA2: 1103
- FMA: 7573

The lower opening of the thorax is formed by the twelfth thoracic vertebra behind, by the eleventh and twelfth ribs at the sides, and in front by the cartilages of the tenth, ninth, eighth, and seventh ribs, which ascend on either side and form an angle, the infrasternal angle or subcostal angle, into the apex of which the xiphoid process projects.

Pregnancy causes the angle to increase from 68° to 103°.
