= Myocardial rupture =

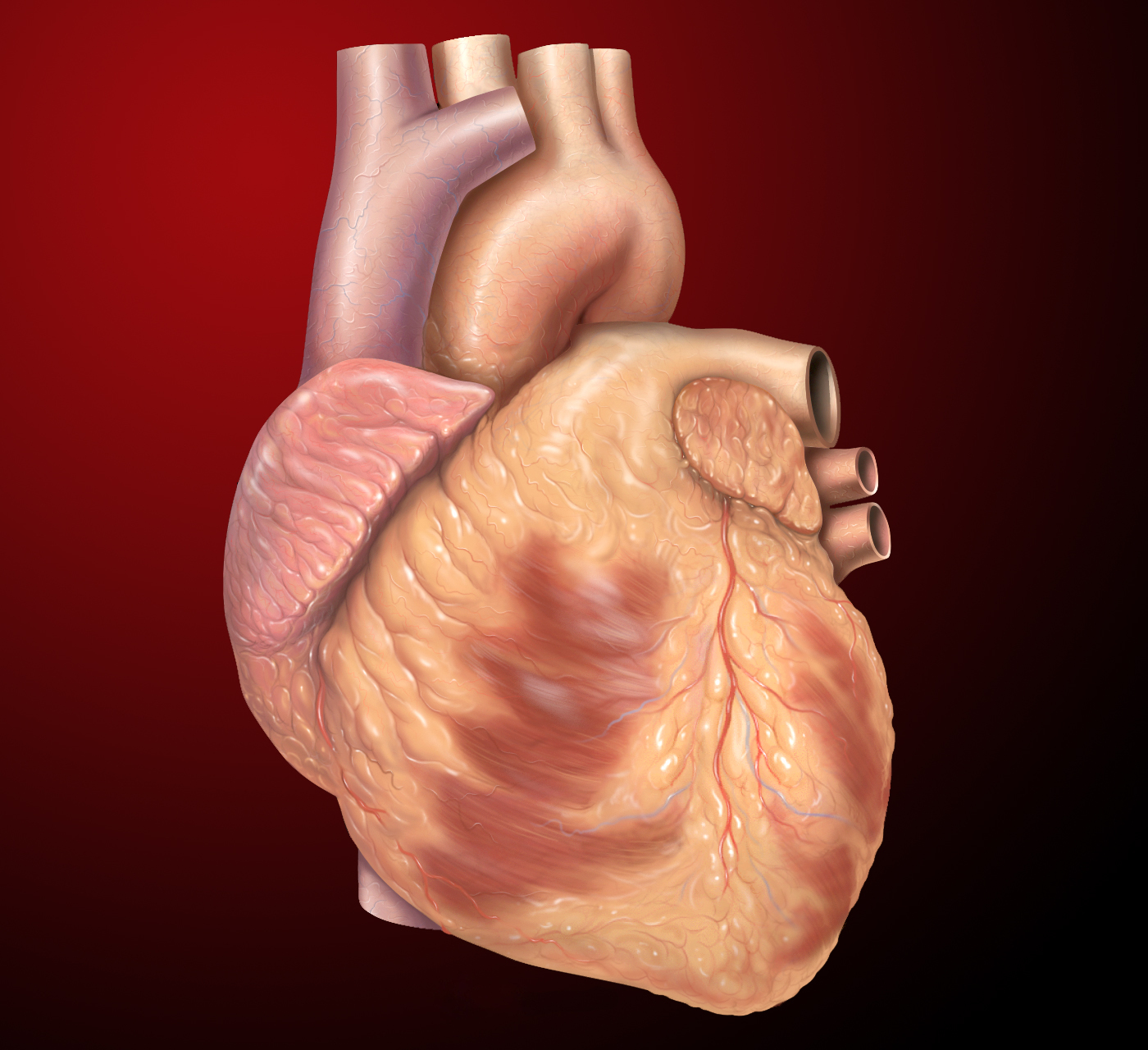
- Realistic view of the human heart
- Specialty: Cardiology

Myocardial rupture is a laceration of the ventricles or atria of the heart, of the interatrial or interventricular septum, or of the papillary muscles. It is most commonly seen as a serious sequela of an acute myocardial infarction (heart attack).

It can also be caused by trauma.

== Signs and symptoms ==
Symptoms of myocardial rupture are recurrent or persistent chest pain, syncope, and distension of jugular vein. Sudden death caused by a myocardial rupture is sometimes preceded by no symptoms.

== Causes ==
The most common cause of myocardial rupture is a recent myocardial infarction, with the rupture typically occurring three to five days after infarction. Other causes of rupture include cardiac trauma, endocarditis (infection of the heart), cardiac tumors, infiltrative diseases of the heart, and aortic dissection.

Risk factors for rupture after an acute myocardial infarction include female gender, advanced age of the individual, first ischemic event, and a low body mass index. Other presenting signs associated with myocardial rupture include a pericardial friction rub, sluggish flow in the coronary artery after it is opened i.e. revascularized with an angioplasty, the left anterior descending artery being often the cause of the acute MI, and delay of revascularization greater than 2 hours.

== Diagnosis ==
Due to the acute hemodynamic deterioration associated with myocardial rupture, the diagnosis is generally made based on physical examination, changes in the vital signs, and clinical suspicion. The diagnosis can be confirmed with echocardiography. The diagnosis is ultimately made at autopsy.

=== Classification ===
Myocardial ruptures can be classified as one of three types.

- Type I myocardial rupture is an abrupt, slit-like tear that generally occurs within 24 hours of an acute myocardial infarction.
- Type II is an erosion of the infarcted myocardium, which is suggestive of a slow tear of the dead myocardium. Type II ruptures typically occur more than 24 hours after the infarction occurred.
- Type III ruptures are characterized by early aneurysm formation and subsequent rupture of the aneurysm.

Another method for classifying myocardial ruptures is by the anatomical portion of the heart that has ruptured. By far the most dramatic is rupture of the free wall of the left or right ventricles, as this is associated with immediate hemodynamic collapse and death secondary to acute pericardial tamponade. Rupture of the interventricular septum will cause a ventricular septal defect. Rupture of a papillary muscle will cause acute mitral regurgitation.

The rupture will most often occur near the edge of the necrotic myocardium where it abuts healthy (but hyperemic) myocardium where the inflammatory response is at its greatest. Further, the rupture will occur in an area of greatest shear stress. Within the left ventricle, these areas are adjacent to both anterior and posterior papillary muscles (regardless of whether the papillary muscle is involved in the infarction).

Left ventricular free wall rupture almost always results in hemopericardium (the exception being in the scenario where the patient has had prior open heart surgery and has obliterative fibrous pericardial adhesions; these would prevent egress of blood) and pericardial tamponade. An accumulation of as little as 75 ml of blood, acquired acutely in a patient without pre-existing pericardial effusion, is sufficient to produce tamponade (wherein the ventricles are incapable of filling and are thus incapable of producing adequate stroke volume).

== Treatment ==
The treatment for myocardial rupture is supportive in the immediate setting and surgical correction of the rupture, if feasible. A certain small percentage of individuals do not seek medical attention in the acute setting and survive to see the physician days or weeks later. In this setting, it may be reasonable to treat the rupture medically and delay or avoid surgery completely, depending on the individual's comorbid medical issues.

== Prognosis ==
The prognosis of myocardial rupture is dependent on a number of factors, including which portion of the myocardium is involved in the rupture. In one case series, if myocardial rupture involved the free wall of the left ventricle, the mortality rate was 100.0%. The chances of survival rise dramatically if the patient: 1. has a witnessed initial event; 2. seeks early medical attention; 3. has an accurate diagnosis by the emergentologist; and 4. happens to be at a facility that has a cardiac surgery service (by whom a quick repair of the rupture can be attempted). Even if the individual survives the initial hemodynamic sequelae of the rupture, the 30‑day mortality is still significantly higher than if rupture did not occur.

== Incidence ==
The incidence of myocardial rupture has decreased in the era of urgent revascularization and aggressive pharmacological therapy for the treatment of an acute myocardial infarction. However, the decrease in the incidence of myocardial rupture is not uniform; there is a slight increase in the incidence of rupture if thrombolytic agents are used to abort a myocardial infarction. On the other hand, if primary percutaneous coronary intervention is performed to abort the infarction, the incidence of rupture is significantly lowered. The incidence of myocardial rupture if PCI is performed in the setting of an acute myocardial infarction is about 1 percent.
