= Beck's triad (cardiology) =

- Other names: acute tamponade triad
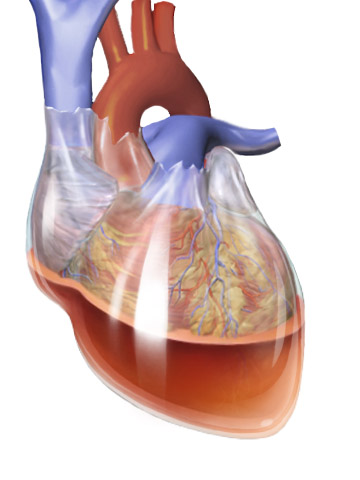
- Hemopericardium, a possible cause of cardiac tamponade
- Differential diagnosis: cardiac tamponade

Beck's triad is a collection of three medical signs associated with acute cardiac tamponade, a medical emergency when excessive fluid accumulates in the pericardial sac around the heart and impairs its ability to pump blood. The signs are low arterial blood pressure, distended neck veins, and distant, muffled heart sounds.

Narrowed pulse pressure might also be observed. The concept was developed in 1935 by Claude Beck, a resident and later Professor of Cardiovascular Surgery at Case Western Reserve University.

== Components ==
The components are:

1. Hypotension with a narrowed pulse pressure
2. Jugular venous distention (JVD)
3. Muffled heart sounds

== Physiology ==
The rising central venous pressure is evidenced by distended jugular veins while in a non-supine position. It is caused by reduced diastolic filling of the right ventricle, due to pressure from the adjacent expanding pericardial sac. This results in a backup of fluid into the veins draining into the heart, most notably, the jugular veins. In severe hypovolemia, the neck veins may not be distended.

== Clinical use ==
Although the full triad is present only in a minority of cases of acute cardiac tamponade, presence of the triad is considered pathognomonic for the condition.
