= Pericardial window =

Cardiac surgical procedure

- ICD-9-CM: 37.12

A pericardial window is a cardiac surgical procedure to create a fistula – or "window" – from the pericardial space to the pleural cavity. The purpose of the window is to allow a pericardial effusion or cardiac tamponade to drain from the space surrounding the heart into the chest cavity.

== Uses ==
Pericardial window may be used to treat pericardial effusion and cardiac tamponade. It is the most common procedure to treat pericardial effusion, particularly if caused by cancer. Untreated, these can lead to death. The pericardial window decreases the incidence of postoperative pericardial tamponade and new-onset atrial fibrillation after open-heart surgery.

== Risks ==
Creation of a pericardial window is a major surgical procedure. To remove pericardial fluid, other more minor techniques should be considered first, such as pericardiocentesis.

== Technique ==
Pericardial window is usually performed under general anaesthetic by a cardiac surgeon. They may make an open surgical incision of up to 10 cm. This is usually located below the xiphoid process of the sternum (sub-xiphoid). Alternatively, access may be gained thoracoscopically with a smaller surgical incision. A small hole of between 1 cm and 2 cm is cut in the pericardium, which is the membrane that surrounds the heart. This allows for any pericardial fluid and other fluid to escape from the pericardium.

== History ==
Pericardial window was first performed by Baron Dominique Jean Larrey in 1829.

== Other animals ==
Pericardial windows are commonly used in veterinary medicine to treat pericardial effusion. Whereas a sub-xiphoid skin incision is preferred in humans, a left para-xiphoid skin incision is preferred in cats.
