= Pericardial fluid =

Serous fluid within the pericardial cavity of the heart

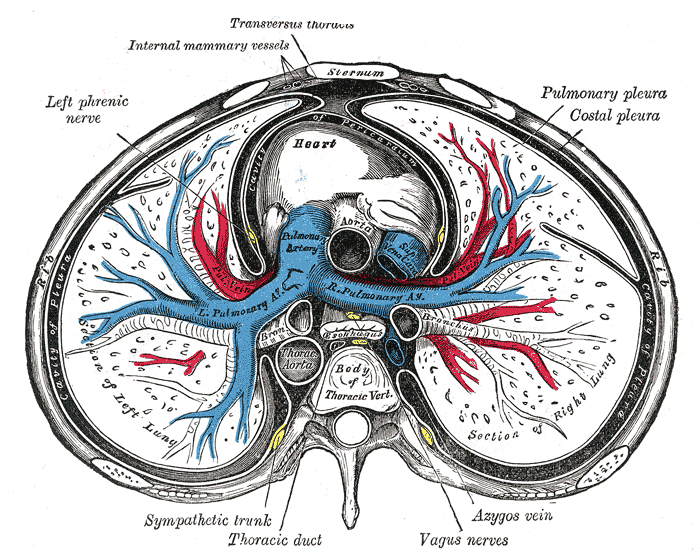
A transverse section of the thorax, showing the contents of the middle and the posterior mediastinum. The pleural and pericardial cavities are exaggerated since normally there is no space between parietal and visceral pleura and between pericardium and heart.

Pericardial fluid is the serous fluid secreted by the serous layer of the pericardium into the pericardial cavity. The pericardium consists of two layers, an outer fibrous layer and the inner serous layer. This serous layer has two membranes which enclose the pericardial cavity into which is secreted the pericardial fluid. The fluid is similar to the cerebrospinal fluid of the brain which also serves to cushion and allow some movement of the organ.

== Function ==
The pericardial fluid reduces friction within the pericardium by lubricating the epicardial surface allowing the membranes to glide over each other with each heart beat.

== Composition ==
Ben-Horin et al. (2005) studied the composition of pericardial fluid in patients undergoing open heart surgery. They found that the fluid is made up of a high concentration of lactate dehydrogenase (LDH), protein and lymphocytes. In a healthy adult there is up to 50 ml of clear, straw-coloured fluid. However, there is little data on the normal composition of pericardial fluid to serve as a reference.

=== Ischemic heart disease ===
In patients with ischemic heart disease there is an accumulation of angiogenic growth factors in the pericardial fluid. These contribute to angiogenesis (the formation of new blood vessels) and arteriogenesis (the increase in diameter of existing arterioles). This helps to prevent myocardial ischemia (lack of oxygen to the heart).

== Pericardial effusion ==
A pericardial effusion is the presence of excessive pericardial fluid, this can be confirmed using an echocardiogram. Small effusions are not necessarily dangerous and are commonly caused by infection such as HIV or can occur after cardiac surgery. Large and rapidly accumulating effusions may cause cardiac tamponade, a life-threatening complication, that puts pressure on the heart preventing the ventricles from filling correctly.

== Pericardiocentesis ==
Pericardiocentesis is a procedure used to remove the pericardial fluid from the pericardial cavity. It is performed using a needle and under the guidance of an ultrasound. It can be used to relieve pressure from pericardial effusions or for diagnostic purposes, showing the cause of abnormalities such as: Cancer, Cardiac perforation, Cardiac trauma, Congestive heart failure, Pericarditis rupture of a ventricular aneurysm.

== Pericardial window ==
This can also be used to treat pericardial effusion or cardiac tamponade.

== Additional images ==
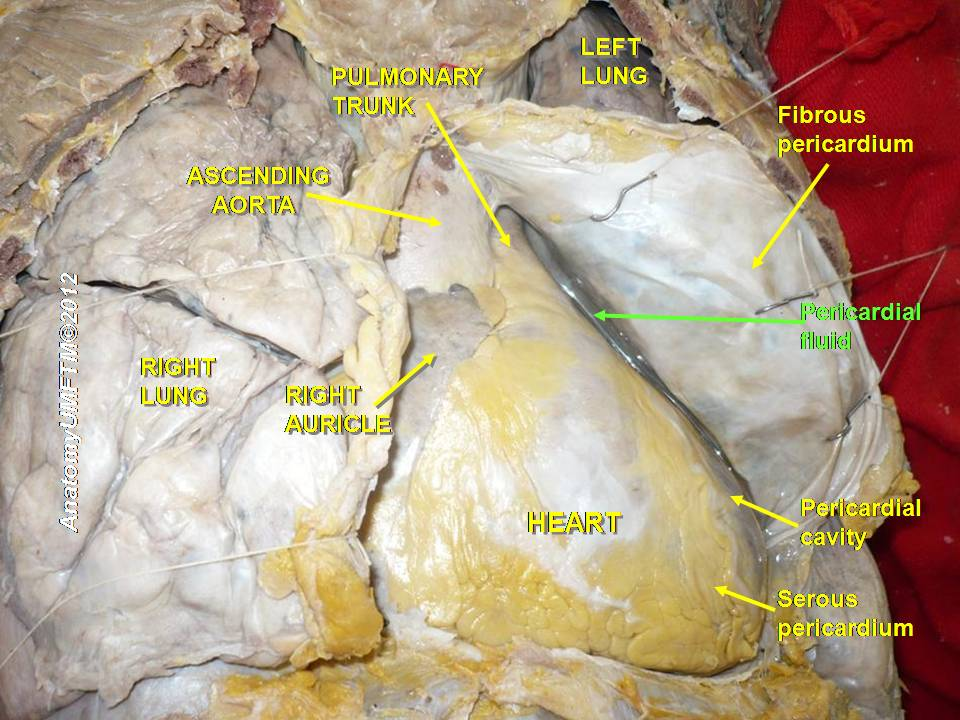
Pericardial fluid
