= Pulsus paradoxus =

Type of abnormal pulse during inhalation

- Synonyms: Paradoxic pulse
- LOINC: 8452-5

Pulsus paradoxus, also paradoxic pulse or paradoxical pulse, is an abnormally large decrease in stroke volume, systolic blood pressure (a drop more than 10 mmHg) and pulse wave amplitude during inspiration. Pulsus paradoxus is not related to pulse rate or heart rate, and it is not a paradoxical rise in systolic pressure. Normally, blood pressure drops less precipitously than 10 mmHg during inhalation. Pulsus paradoxus is a sign that is indicative of several conditions, most commonly pericardial effusion.

The paradox in pulsus paradoxus is that, on physical examination, one can detect beats on cardiac auscultation during inspiration that cannot be palpated at the radial pulse. It results from an accentuated decrease of the blood pressure, which leads to the (radial) pulse not being palpable and may be accompanied by an increase in the jugular venous pressure height (Kussmaul's sign). As is usual with inspiration, the heart rate is slightly increased, due to decreased left ventricular output.

== Mechanism ==
During inspiration, the negative intra-thoracic pressure results in an increased right venous return, filling the right atrium more than during an exhalation. The increased blood volume dilates the right atrium, reducing the compliance of the left atrium due to their shared septum. Lower left atrial compliance reduces the left atrium venous return and as a consequence causes a reduction in left ventricular preload. This results in a reduction in left ventricular stroke volume and will be noted as a reduction in systolic blood pressure in inspiration. Pulsus paradoxus is therefore an exaggeration or an increase in the fall of systolic BP beyond 10 mmHg during inspiration.

Normally during inspiration, a person's systolic blood pressure decreases by ≤10 mmHg and heart rate slightly increases. This is because inspiration decreases intra-thoracic pressure relative to atmospheric pressure, which increases blood flow (systemic venous return) to the right atrium of the heart by reducing pressure on the veins, particularly the venae cavae. However, the decrease in intra-thoracic pressure and stretching of the lungs during inhalation also expands the compliant pulmonary vasculature so that blood pools in the lungs and decreases pulmonary venous return to the left atrium. Also, the increased systemic venous return to the right side of the heart expands the right heart and directly compromises filling of the left side of the heart by slightly bulging the septum to the left, reducing maximum volume. Reduced left-heart filling leads to a reduced stroke volume which manifests as a decrease in systolic blood pressure, leading to a faster heart rate due to the inhibition of the baroreceptor reflex, which stimulates sympathetic outflow to the heart.

Under normal physiologic conditions the large pressure gradient between the right and left ventricles prevents the septum from bulging dramatically into the left ventricle during inspiration. However such bulging does occur during cardiac tamponade where pressure equalizes between all of the chambers of the heart. As the right ventricle receives more volume, it pushes the septum into the left ventricle further reducing its volume in turn. This additional loss of volume of the left ventricle that only occurs with equalization of the pressures (as in tamponade) allows for the further reduction in volume, so cardiac output is reduced, leading to a further decline in BP. However, in situations where the left ventricular pressure remains higher than the pericardial sac (most frequently from coexisting disease with an elevated left ventricular diastolic pressure), there is no pulsus paradoxus.

Although one or both of these mechanisms may occur, a third may additionally contribute. The large negative intra-thoracic pressure increases the pressure across the wall of the left ventricle (increased transmural pressure, equivalent to [pressure within ventricle] - [pressure outside of ventricle]). This pressure gradient, resisting the contraction of the left ventricle, causes an increase in afterload. This results in a decrease in stroke volume, contributing to the decreased pulse pressure and increased heart rate as described above. Pulsus paradoxus occurs not only with severe cardiac tamponade but also with asthma, obstructive sleep apnea and croup. The mechanism, at least with severe tamponade, is likely very similar to those of hypertrophic and restrictive cardiomyopathies (diastolic dysfunction), where a decrease in Left Ventricular (LV) filling corresponds to an increasingly reduced stroke volume. In other words, with these cardiomyopathies, as LV filling decreases, ejection fraction decreases directly, yet non-linearly and with a negative concavity (negative first and second derivatives). Similarly, with tamponade, the degree of diastolic dysfunction is inversely proportional to the LV end-diastolic volume. So during inspiration, since LV filling is lesser relative to that during expiration, the diastolic dysfunction is also proportionally greater, so the systolic pressure drops >10 mmHg. This mechanism is also likely with pericarditis, where diastolic function is chastened.

== Measurement ==
Pulse pressure is quantified using a blood pressure cuff and stethoscope (Korotkoff sounds), by measuring the variation of the systolic pressure during expiration and inspiration.

To measure the pulsus paradoxus, place a blood pressure cuff on the patient's arm and very slowly deflate the cuff while listening for brachial pulsations. Note the pressure that you first hear with pulsations during expiration (which will be the highest). Repeat the process, and record the pressure of pulsations heard during inspiration (which will be the lowest).

If the pressure difference between the two readings is >10mmHg, it can be classified as pulsus paradoxus.

== Causes ==
Pulsus paradoxus can be caused by several physiologic mechanisms. Anatomically, these can be grouped into:

- cardiac causes,
- pulmonary causes, and
- non-pulmonary and non-cardiac causes.

Considered physiologically, pulsus paradoxus is caused by:

- decreased right heart functional reserve, e.g. myocardial infarction and tamponade,
- right ventricular inflow or outflow obstruction, e.g. superior vena cava obstruction and pulmonary embolism, and
- decreased blood to the left heart due to lung hyperinflation (e.g. asthma, COPD) and anaphylactic shock.

=== List of causes ===
Cardiac:

- constrictive pericarditis. One study found that pulsus paradoxus occurs in less than 20% of patients with constrictive pericarditis.
- pericardial effusion, including cardiac tamponade
- cardiogenic shock

Pulmonary:

- pulmonary embolism
- tension pneumothorax
- asthma (especially with severe asthma exacerbations)
- chronic obstructive pulmonary disease

Non-pulmonary and non-cardiac:

- anaphylactic shock
- hypovolemia
- superior vena cava obstruction
- pregnancy
- obesity

Pulsus paradoxus has been shown to be predictive of the severity of cardiac tamponade. Pulsus paradoxus may not be seen with cardiac tamponade if an atrial septal defect or significant aortic regurgitation is also present.

== See also ==
- List of paradoxes
- Precordial exam
- Pulsus alternans
