= Pericardium =

Double-walled sac containing the heart and roots of the great vessels

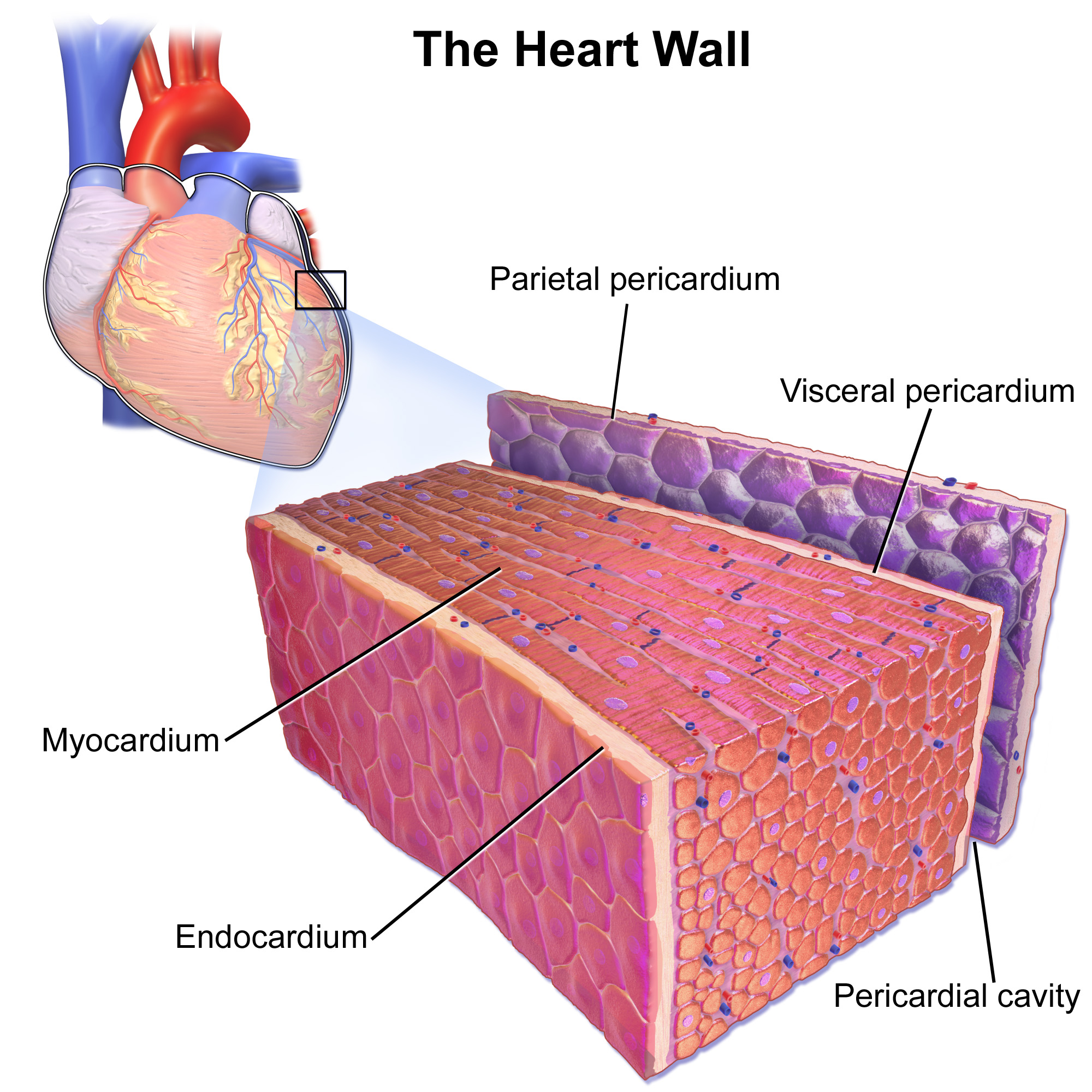
- Walls of the heart, showing pericardium at right

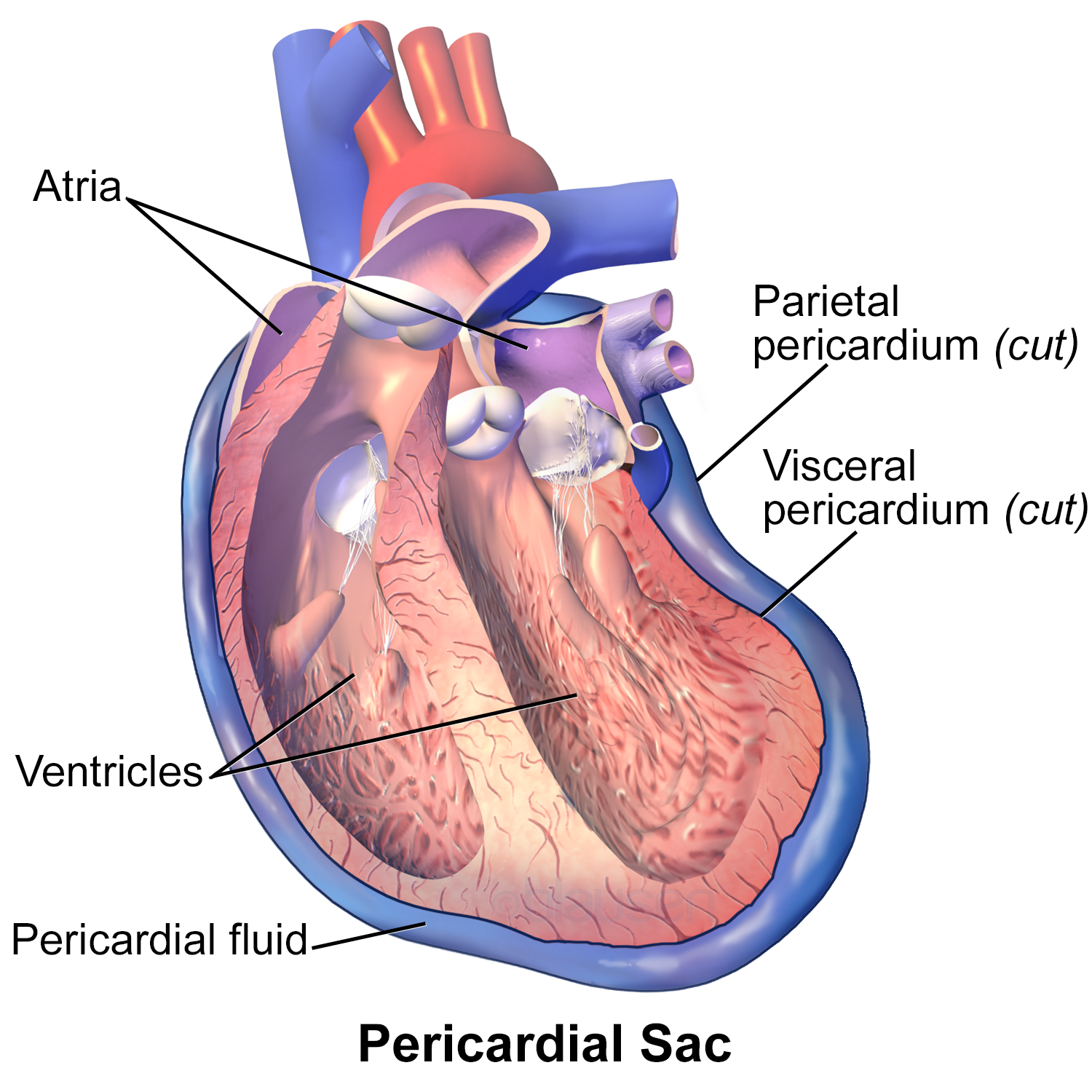
- Cutaway illustration of pericardial sac

Details
- Location: A sac around the heart
- Artery: Pericardiacophrenic artery
- Nerve: Phrenic nerve

Identifiers
- Latin: pericardium
- Greek: περίκάρδιον
- MeSH: D010496
- TA98: A12.1.08.001; A12.1.08.002
- TA2: 3341
- FMA: 9869

The pericardium (pl. pericardia), also called pericardial sac, is a fluid filled sac containing the heart and the roots of the great vessels. It has three layers, an outer layer made of strong inelastic connective tissue (fibrous pericardium), and a double-layered inner membrane serous membrane (serous pericardium), between which the pericardial fluid is contained. It encloses the pericardial cavity, which contains pericardial fluid, and defines the middle mediastinum. It separates the heart from interference of other structures, protects it against infection and blunt trauma, and lubricates the heart's movements.

== Etymology ==
The English name originates from the Ancient Greek prefix peri- (περί) 'around' and the root -kardia (κάρδιον) 'heart'.

== Anatomy ==
The pericardium is a tough fibroelastic sac which covers the heart from all sides except at the cardiac root (where the great vessels join the heart) and the bottom (where only the serous pericardium exists to cover the upper surface of the central tendon of diaphragm). The fibrous pericardium is semi-rigid, while the serous pericardium is quite pliable.

The same mesothelium that constitutes the serous pericardium also covers the heart as the epicardium, resulting in a continuous serous membrane invaginated onto itself as two opposing surfaces (over the fibrous pericardium and over the heart). This creates a pouch-like potential space around the heart enclosed between the two opposing serosal surfaces, known as the pericardial space or pericardial cavity, which is filled with a small amount of serous fluid to lubricate the heart's movements and cushions it from any external jerk or shock.

=== Fibrous ===
The fibrous pericardium is the outside layer of the pericardium, made up of dense and loose connective tissue. While capable of some change in shape, it is largely non-pliable, which acts to protect the heart against blunt forces and sudden pressure change from the outside. It is continuous with the outer adventitial layer of the neighboring great blood vessels, fused with the central fibrous area of the diaphragm on its posterior aspect and attached to the posterior surface of the sternum by the sternopericardial ligaments.

=== Serous ===
The serous pericardium, in turn, is divided into two parts:

- The parietal serous pericardium, which lines the interior side of the superficial portion of the pericardial sac, is fused to and inseparable from the fibrous pericardium
- The visceral serous pericardium, also known as the epicardium, covers the myocardium of the heart and can be considered its serosa. It is largely made of a mesothelium overlying some elastin-rich loose connective tissue. During ventricular contraction, the wave of depolarization moves from the endocardial to the epicardial surface.

Both of these layers function in lubricating the heart to prevent friction during heart activity.

The visceral serous pericardium extends to the root of the great vessels and joins the parietal serous pericardium at the anatomical base of the heart. This junction occurs at two areas: the ventricular outflow tracts where the aorta and pulmonary trunk leave the heart, and the inflow tracts where the superior/inferior vena cava and pulmonary veins enter the heart. The root of the great vessels and the associated reflections of the serous pericardium creates various smaller sacs and tunnels known as pericardial sinuses, as well as radiographically significant pericardial recesses, where pericardial fluid can pool and mimic mediastinal lymphadenopathy.

=== Anatomical relationships ===
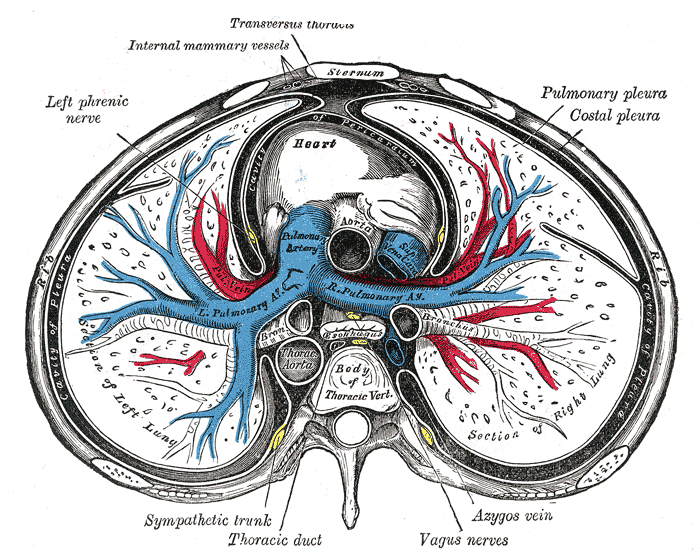
A transverse section of the thorax, showing the contents of the middle and the posterior mediastinum. The pleural cavity and the pericardial cavity are exaggerated since normally there is no space between the pleurae or between the pericardium and heart. Pericardium is also known as cardiac epidermis.

- Surrounds heart and bases of pulmonary artery and aorta.
- Deep to sternum and anterior chest wall.
- The right phrenic nerve passes to the right of the pericardium.
- The left phrenic nerve passes over the pericardium of the left ventricle.
- Pericardial arteries supply blood to the dorsal portion of the pericardium.

== Function ==
The pericardium sets the heart in mediastinum and limits its motion, protects it from infection, lubricates it and prevents excessive dilation in cases of acute volume overload.

== Clinical significance ==
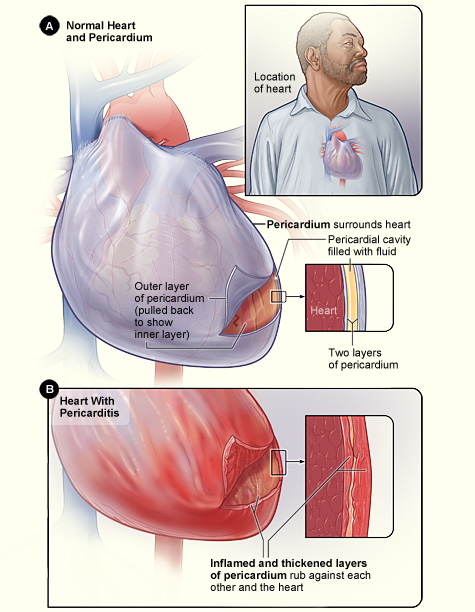
Illustration of the pericardial sac and the sac when inflamed

Inflammation of the pericardium is called pericarditis. This condition typically causes chest pain that spreads to the back and is made worse by lying flat. In patients suffering with pericarditis, a pericardial friction rub can often be heard when listening to the heart with a stethoscope. Pericarditis is often caused by a viral infection (glandular fever, cytomegalovirus, or coxsackievirus), or more rarely with a bacterial infection, but may also occur following a myocardial infarction. Pericarditis is usually a short-lived condition that can be successfully treated with painkillers, anti-inflammatories, and colchicine. In some cases, pericarditis can become a long-term condition causing scarring of the pericardium which restricts the heart's movement, known as constrictive pericarditis. Constrictive pericarditis is sometimes treated by surgically removing the pericardium in a procedure called a pericardiectomy.

Fluid can build up within the pericardial space, referred to as a pericardial effusion. Pericardial effusions often occur secondary to pericarditis, kidney failure, or tumours and frequently do not cause any symptoms. Large effusions or effusions that accumulate rapidly can compress the heart and restrict diastolic ventricular filling in a condition known as cardiac tamponade, causing pulsus paradoxus and potentially fatal circulatory failure. Fluid can be removed from the pericardial space for diagnosis or to relieve tamponade using a syringe in a procedure called pericardiocentesis. For cases of recurrent pericardial effusion, an operation to create a hole between the pericardial and pleural spaces can be performed, known as a pericardial window or pericardiostomy.

The congenital absence of pericardium is rare. When it happens, it usually occurs on the left side. Those affected usually do not have any symptoms and they are usually discovered incidentally. About 30 to 50 percent of the affected people have other heart abnormalities such as atrial septal defect, patent ductus arteriosus, bicuspid aortic valve, and lung abnormalities. On chest X–ray, the heart looks posteriorly rotated. Another feature is the sharp delineation of pulmonary artery and transverse aorta due to lung deposition between these two structures. If there is partial absence of pericardium, there will be bulge of the left atrial appendage. On CT and MRI scans, similar findings as chest X–ray can be shown. The left sided partial pericardium defect is difficult to see because even a normal pericardium is difficult to be seen on CT and MRI. A complete pericardial defect will show the heart displaced to the left with part of the lungs squeezed between inferior border of heart and diaphragm.

== Additional images ==
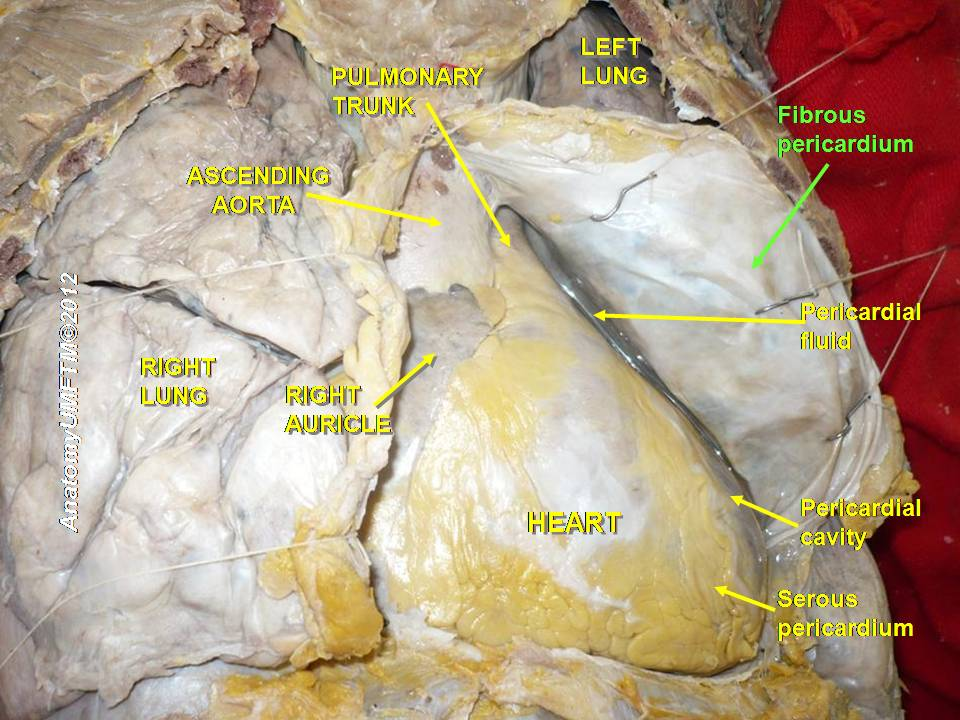
Fibrous pericardium

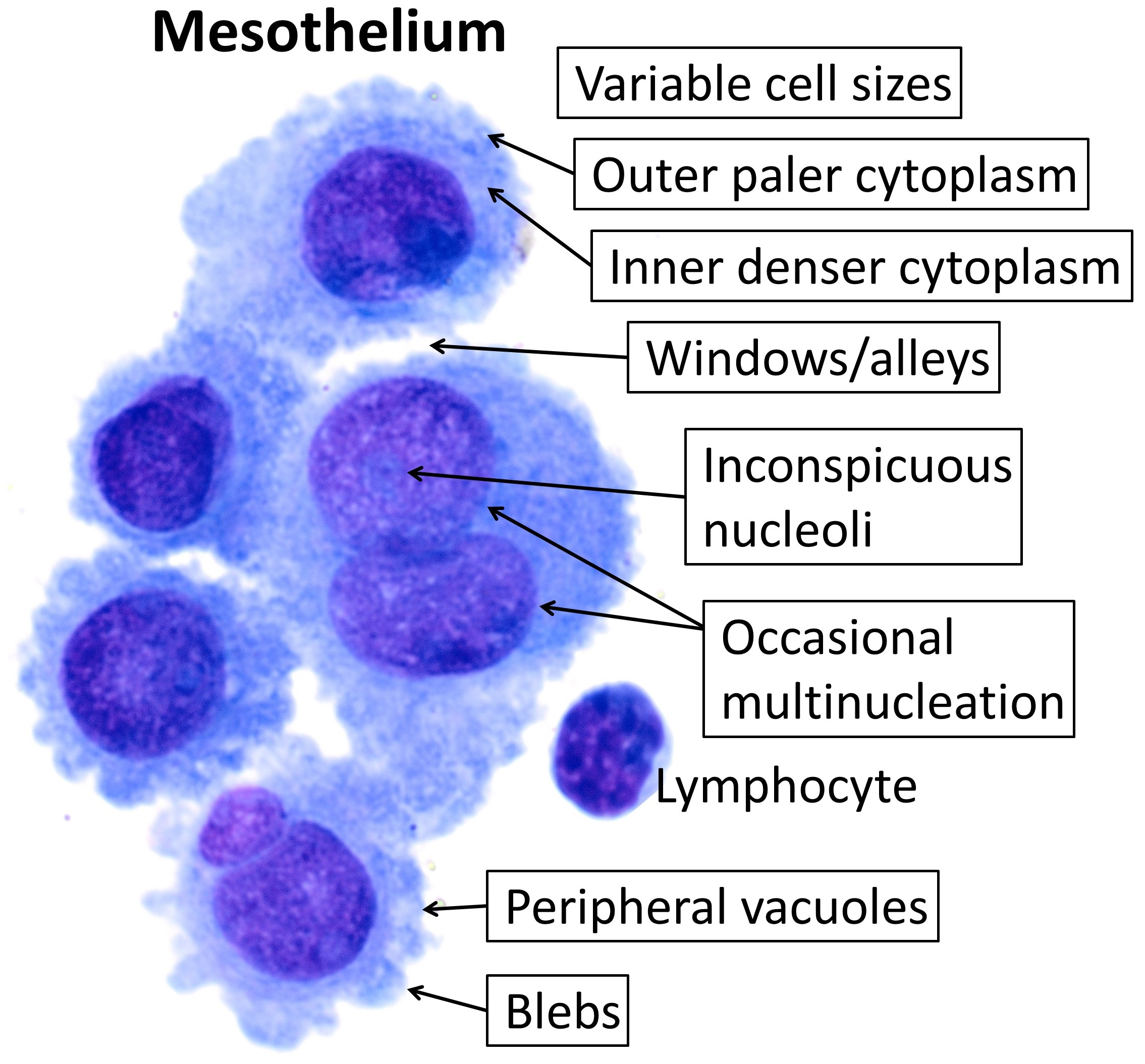
Cytology of the normal mesothelial cells that line the pericardium, with typical features. Wright's stain.

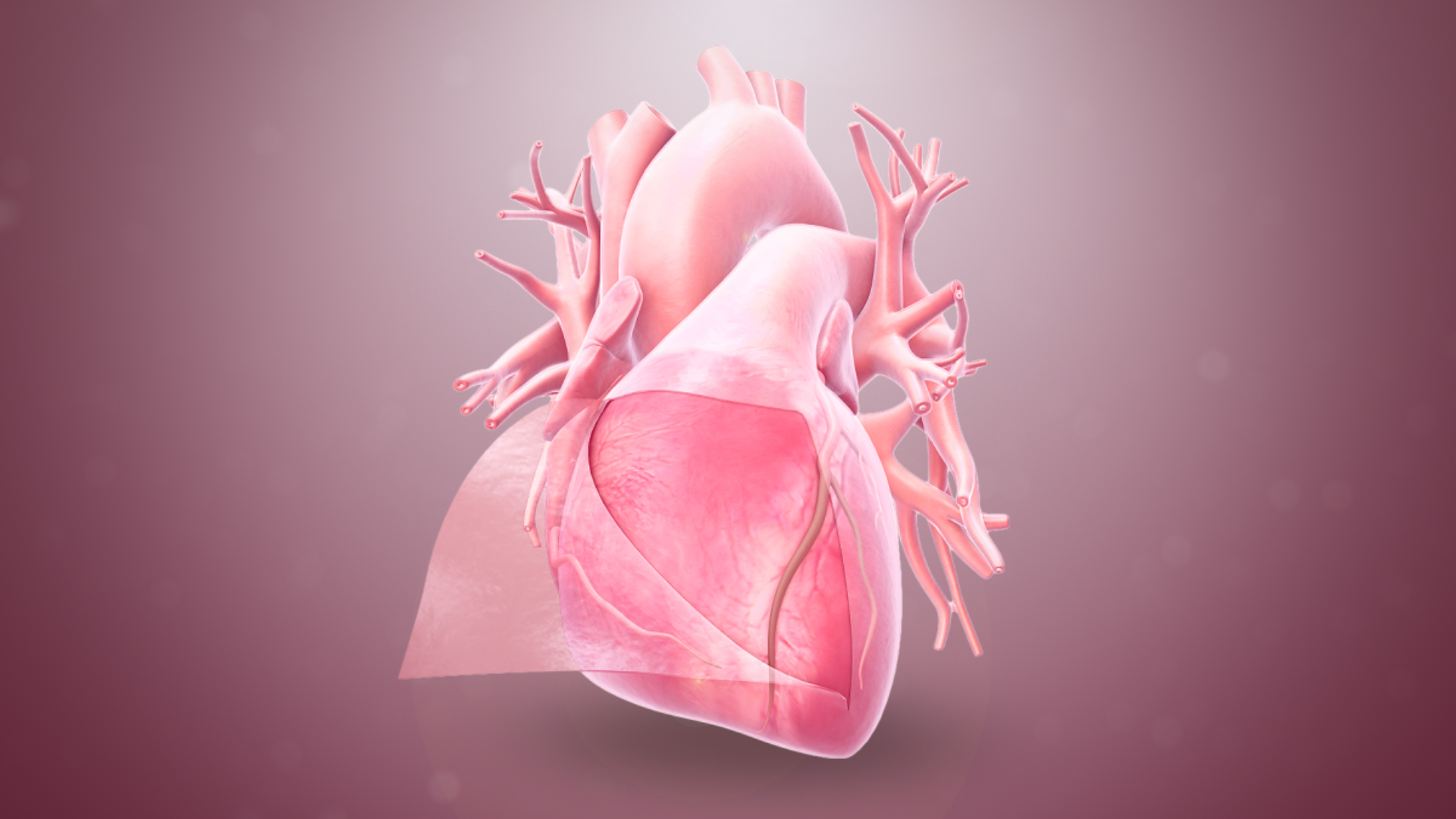
3D still showing the pericardium layer
