= Tuberculous pericarditis =

- Specialty: Infectious diseases

Tuberculous pericarditis is a form of pericarditis. It is a condition in which the pericardium surrounding the heart is infected by the bacterial species Mycobacterium tuberculosis. Tuberculous pericarditis accounts for a significant percentage of presentations of tuberculosis worldwide. The condition has four stages of disease which manifests with clinical presentations ranging from acute pericarditis to overt heart failure. Tuberculous pericarditis is an under-diagnosed condition. Diagnosis often requires a range of diagnostic tools, including pericardiocentesis, biochemical tests, and imaging. Treatment of this disease is similar to treatment of pulmonary tuberculosis. Alternative treatment options to reduce cardiac complications are also available.

== Epidemiology ==
Tuberculous pericarditis is a condition that accounts for 1-2% of presentations of tuberculosis outside of the lungs. It is found in people of all ages and typically affects males more frequently than females. Tuberculosis is also one of the leading causes of effusive pericarditis worldwide. In tuberculosis-endemic regions, tuberculous pericarditis accounts for 50-90% of cases of effusive pericarditis, depending on HIV status. In developed countries, it only accounts for about 4% of cases. Tuberculous pericarditis is a deadly disease with a mortality rate of up to 40% in the first 6 months after diagnosis.

== Pathogenesis ==
Tuberculous pericarditis is caused by infection with the bacterial species Mycobacterium tuberculosis. Bacteria enter the body through inhalation and are ingested by white blood cells called macrophages. Surviving bacteria multiply and can spread to other areas of the body. This can occur through the lymphatic system, blood, or via direct spread from infected tissues. Infection of the pericardium is assisted by a variety of inflammatory and fibrotic mediators. These mediators include IL-10, IL-1β, IL-6, IL-8, interferon-γ induced protein, and tumor necrosis factor. These mediators then accumulate in the pericardial fluid leading to inflammation and fibrosis. Certain individuals have an increased risk of infectious spread to the pericardium. This includes people with immunosuppression, HIV/AIDS, chronic kidney disease, and diabetes, amongst others.

There are four stages of tuberculous pericarditis following infection by Mycobacterium tuberculosis:

	Manifestation	Pathological Basis	Clinical Presentation
Stage 1	Dry stage	Fibrinous exudation; Abundant mycobacteria; Granuloma formation	Acute pericarditis
Stage 2	Effusive stage	Lymphocytic exudation; Serosanguineous effusion	Heart failure; Cardiac tamponade; Effusive constrictive pericarditis
Stage 3	Adsorptive stage	Absorption of effusion; Pericardial thickening; Fibrosis	Constrictive pericarditis
Stage 4	Constrictive stage	Constructive scarring; Calcification of pericardium	Constrictive pericarditis

== Signs and symptoms ==
Tuberculous pericarditis commonly presents with symptoms similar to both pulmonary tuberculosis and heart failure. These symptoms include:

- Fever
- Fatigue
- Night sweats
- Weight loss
- Shortness of breath
- Chest pain
- Cough

Indications of pericarditis or heart failure may also be seen on physical exam. These signs include increased heart rate, decreased blood pressure, pericardial friction rub, ascites, and lower extremity edema. The clinical presentation depends on the stage of disease. The dry stage presents with features resembling acute pericarditis (chest pain, pericardial friction rub, diffuse ST-segment elevation on EKG, etc.). The effusive, adsorptive, and constrictive stages typically present with features of heart failure (shortness of breath, ascites, peripheral edema, etc.).

== Diagnosis ==
Tuberculous pericarditis is an under-diagnosed condition with up to 15-20% of people with the disease never being formally diagnosed. It is difficult to diagnose because definitive diagnosis requires culturing Mycobacterium tuberculosis from aspirated pericardial fluid. This can be achieved via pericardiocentesis, which has both therapeutic and diagnostic utility. Pericardial biopsy is another method of obtaining samples, although this method is invasive and is used less frequently. Culturing pericardial fluid is currently the most widely used diagnostic test for tuberculous pericarditis. However, this process is lengthy and may take up to 3 weeks to receive results. Biochemical tests are another method for diagnosis, as these are much less time consuming. Adenosine deaminase (ADA) is the most widely used biochemical test. Other options include Xpert MTB/RIF and IFN-γ, but these tests are costly and therefore less available.

When collecting pericardial fluid is not possible, the Tygerberg scoring system helps the clinician to decide whether pericarditis is due to tuberculosis or another cause. In tuberculosis-endemic regions, ≥6 points is highly predictive of tuberculous pericarditis:

- Fever = 2 points
- Night sweats = 1 point
- Loss of body mass = 1 points
- Globulin level > 40 g/L = 3 points
- Peripheral leukocyte count < 10 × 10^9/L = 3 points

Radiography is another method used to aid in the diagnosis of tuberculous pericarditis. This imaging can help identify effusions, calcifications, and thickening around the heart. Echocardiography is the first-line imaging modality for diagnosis of pericarditis. Chest X-Ray, CT scans, and MRI are also widely used options.

== Management ==
There are three main goals in the management of tuberculous pericarditis. These goals are to kill the active infection, reduce heart strain and associated symptoms, and prevent future cardiac complications. Elimination of the infection is through the same therapy used in pulmonary tuberculosis. This therapy consists of a 2-month regimen of rifampin, isoniazid, pyrazinamide, and ethambutol followed by 4-months of rifampin and isoniazid. However, recent research has yet to evaluate the definitive length of anti-tuberculosis treatment required for tuberculous pericarditis. Reducing heart strain and improving symptoms is achieved primarily through pericardiocentesis. This procedure helps to reduce fluid accumulation around the heart. Constrictive pericarditis is the main long-term complication of tuberculous pericarditis that requires management. Corticosteroids have long been thought to help reduce the risk of future cardiac complications. Colchicine is a drug thought to reduce the recurrence of constrictive pericarditis, although evidence is limited. The use of fibrinolytics and ACE inhibitors are also options to help reduce pericardial fibrosis. Pericardiectomy may be indicated in severe cases, as open surgical drainage of fluid around the heart may reduce risk of future fluid accumulation.
