= Duke Treadmill Score =

Cardiac test metric

- Purpose: predicting the risk of ischemia or infarction

Duke Treadmill Score is a tool for predicting the risk of ischemia or infarction in the heart muscle. The score is a function of data from an exercise test:

[exercise duration in minutes, by Bruce protocol] – [ 5 × (maximal ST elevation or depression, in millimeters)] – [4 × (treadmill angina index)]

Angina index is zero if no pain occurs during the exercise, one if the pain is limited to the exercise period but the patient can continue the exercise (typical angina), and two if a pain is a reason to stop the exercise test.

Duke treadmill scores typically range from –25 (highest risk) to +15 (lowest risk). One-year mortality and five-year survival rates respectively for the results of the Duke treadmill score have been reported as follows:

less than or equal to –11: 5.25%, 65%
–10 to 4: 1.25%, 90%
greater than or equal to 5: 0.25%, 97%
