= Heart inflammation =

Heart inflammation may refer to:

- Endocarditis, inflammation of the endocardium
- Myocarditis
- Pericarditis, inflammation of the pericardium
