= Uremic pericarditis =

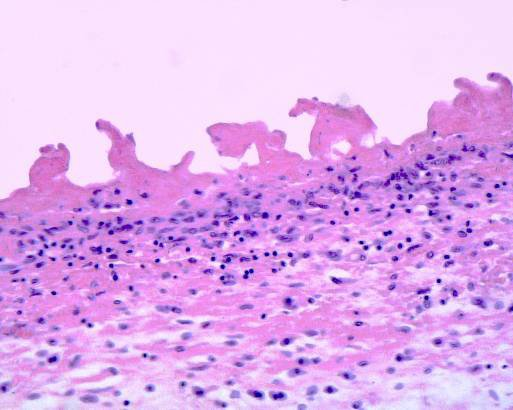
- Pericarditis fibrinosa
- Specialty: Urology

Uremic pericarditis is a form of pericarditis. It causes fibrinous pericarditis. The main cause of the disease is poorly understood.

== Signs and symptoms ==
Fibrinous pericarditis is an exudative inflammation. The pericardium is infiltrated by the fibrinous exudate. This consists of fibrin strands and leukocytes. Fibrin describes an amorphous, eosinophilic (pink) network. Leukocytes (white blood cells; mainly neutrophils) are found within the fibrin deposits and intrapericardic. Vascular congestion is also present. Inflammatory cells do not penetrate the myocardium (as is seen with other presentations of pericarditis), and as a result, this particular variant does not present with diffuse ST elevation on ECG (a classic sign of pericarditis known as stage I ECG changes which are seen with other causes) because the inflammatory cells do not penetrate the myocardium. To naked eye examination, this pathology is referred to as having a "Bread and Butter Appearance".

== Pathology ==
Uremic pericarditis is associated with azotemia, and occurs in about 6-10% of kidney failure patients. The blood urea nitrogen test (BUN) is typically >60 mg/dL (normal range is 7–20 mg/dL). However, the degree of pericarditis does not correlate with the degree of serum BUN or creatinine elevation. The pathogenesis is poorly understood.

== Treatment ==
Uremic pericarditis is effectively treated with hemodialysis and can resolve the symptoms and decrease the size of any pericardial effusion, if present.
