= Robert A. Bruce =

American cardiologist

Robert Arthur Bruce
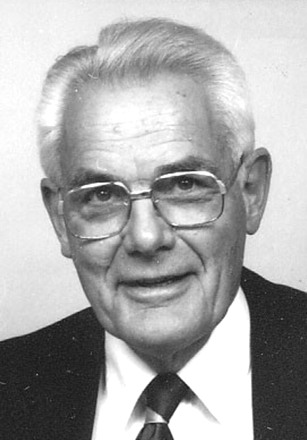
- Born: November 20, 1916; Somerville, Massachusetts
- Died: February 12, 2004 (aged 87); Seattle, Washington

Robert Arthur Bruce (November 20, 1916 – February 12, 2004) was an American cardiologist and a professor at the University of Washington. He was known as the "father of exercise cardiology" for his research and development of the Bruce Protocol.

== Early life and education ==
Bruce was born on November 20, 1916, in Somerville, Massachusetts. He received a Bachelor of Science degree from Boston University and graduated from the University of Rochester School of Medicine in 1943. He completed an internship and internal medicine residency at the University of Rochester Strong Memorial Hospital, where he was Chief Resident in Medicine. He joined the Faculty of Medicine at the University of Rochester in 1946. Bruce left Rochester in 1950, joining the faculty at the University of Washington School of Medicine where he was named as the first Chief of Cardiology by Robert H. Williams, the founding Chief of Medicine at the school. He was director of the Division of Cardiology until 1971, and co-director with Dr. Harold T. Dodge for another 10 years.

== Early career ==
Bruce initially studied patients with rheumatic valvular disease and the use of exercise stress testing in those patients. He established guidelines in 1956 for the grouping of patients into New York Heart Association Functional Classification I through IV. Bruce's early use of the treadmill for stress testing was a single-stage test at a fixed rate and fixed grade. Bruce later recognized the limitations of the single-stage test and its inability to maximally stress all patients. He then subsequently developed a multi-stage test that would allow each patient to attain their own self-determined point of maximal exertion.

== Exercise stress testing ==
Before the development of the Bruce Protocol, there was no safe, standardized protocol that could be used to monitor cardiac function in exercising patients. Master's Two-Step Test was sometimes used, but it was too strenuous for many patients and inadequate for the assessment of respiratory and circulatory function during varying amounts of exercise. Most physicians relied upon patients' complaints about exertion and examined them only at rest. To address these problems, Bruce and Dr. Paul Yu began work on developing a treadmill exercise test. The test made extensive use of relatively new technological developments in electrocardiographs and motorized treadmills.

A Bruce exercise test involved walking on a treadmill while the heart was monitored by an electrocardiograph with various electrodes attached to the body. Ventilation volumes and respiratory gas exchanges were also monitored, before, during, and after exercise. Because the treadmill speed and inclination could be adjusted, this physical activity was tolerated by most patients.

Initial experiments involved a single-stage test, in which subjects walked for 10 minutes on the treadmill at a fixed workload. Bruce's first paper on treadmill exercise tests, published in 1949, analyzed minute-by-minute changes in the respiratory and circulatory function of normal adults and patients with heart or lung ailments.

In 1950 Bruce joined the University of Washington, where he continued research on the single-stage test, particularly as a predictor of the success of surgery for valvular or congenital heart disease. Later he developed the multistage test, consisting of several stages of progressively greater workloads. It was this multistage test, a description of which was first published in 1963, that became known as the Bruce Protocol. In the initial paper, Bruce reported that the test could detect signs of such conditions as angina pectoris, a previous heart attack, or a ventricular aneurysm. Bruce and his colleagues also demonstrated that exercise testing was useful in screening apparently healthy people for early signs of coronary artery disease.

== Seattle Heart Watch ==
Bruce and Dr. Harold T. Dodge initiated the Seattle Heart Watch program in 1971. This program involved community physicians in hospitals, offices, and the medical department of the Boeing Company. It tested the feasibility, utility, and reproducibility of results of symptom-limited exercise testing in ambulatory cardiac patients and apparently healthy subjects. A database of more than 10,000 individuals was developed over the next 10 years. Signals from the treadmill monitors were sent by dataphone from 15 different test sites to the University Hospital research lab for analysis, and follow-up questionnaires from thousands of patients were accumulated for years. This database was used to develop normal standards based on age, sex, and habitual pattern of activity. The duration of exercise became the principal measurement for the estimation of what Bruce termed functional aerobic impairment.

The Seattle Heart Watch program demonstrated the feasibility and safety of the Bruce Protocol. It also demonstrated that it was a powerful prognostic tool.

== Other research ==
Bruce developed an early interest in the use of computers in cardiology and established a computer laboratory in the Division of Cardiology. He devised a method for quantifying the QRS and ST segments in the EKG during exercise. In the late 1950s, he was also one of the first to suggest the possible benefit of thrombolysis in acute myocardial infarction. Bruce published more than 300 scientific articles, a major contribution to the knowledge of cardiovascular physiology in health and disease. He was a founding member of the Association of University Cardiologists and its second president, in 1969.

As well as a scientific researcher, Bruce was also a clinician and a teacher. There is now a Robert A. Bruce Endowed Chair in Cardiovascular Research at the University of Washington.

== Personal life and death ==
Bruce died on February 12, 2004, in Seattle, Washington.

== See also ==
- Cardiac stress test - treadmill testing
- Metabolic equivalent - METs
