= Tygerberg score =

Clinical decision tool for pericarditis

- Purpose: helps decide whether pericarditis is due to tuberculosis

The Tygerberg score is a clinical decision tool that allows the clinician to decide whether pericarditis is due to tuberculosis or not. It uses five variables:

1. Weight loss (1 point)
2. Night sweats (1 point)
3. Fever (2 points)
4. Serum globulin >40 g/L (3 points)
5. Blood leukocyte count <10 billion/L (3 points)

A total score of 6 or more is highly suggestive that tuberculosis is the cause of the pericarditis.
