= ST segment =

Feature of an electrocardiogram

Schematic representation of normal ECG

In electrocardiography, the ST segment connects the QRS complex and the T wave and has a duration of 0.005 to 0.150 sec (5 to 150 ms).

It starts at the J point (junction between the QRS complex and ST segment) and ends at the beginning of the T wave. However, since it is usually difficult to determine exactly where the ST segment ends and the T wave begins, the relationship between the ST segment and T wave should be examined together. The typical ST segment duration is usually around 0.08 sec (80 ms). It should be essentially level with the PR and TP segments.

The ST segment represents the isoelectric period when the ventricles are in between depolarization and repolarization.

== Interpretation ==
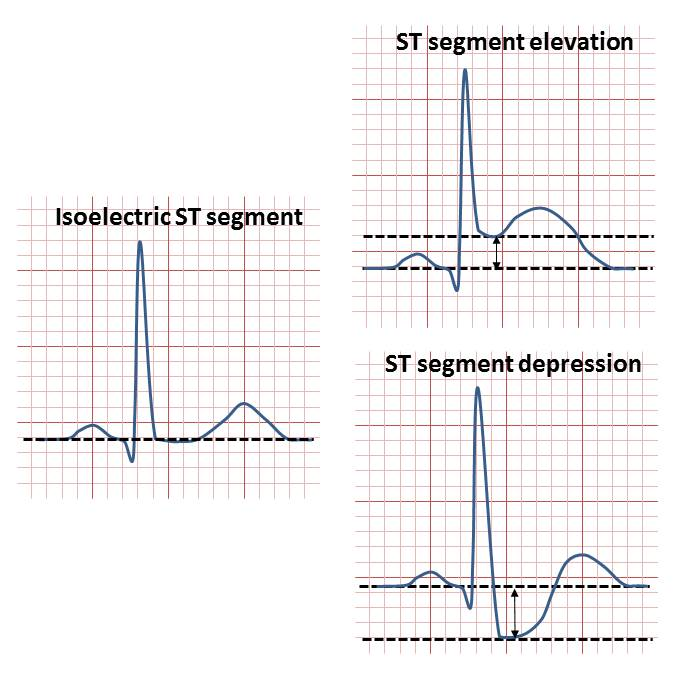
- Illustration of ST segment elevation and depression
  The normal ST segment has a slight upward concavity.
- Flat, downsloping, or depressed ST segments may indicate coronary ischemia.
- ST elevation may indicate transmural myocardial infarction. An elevation of >1mm and longer than 80 milliseconds following the J-point. This measure has a false positive rate of 15-20% (which is slightly higher in women than men) and a false negative rate of 20–30%.
- ST depression may be associated with subendocardial myocardial infarction, hypokalemia, or digitalis toxicity.

== In fetal monitoring ==
In fetal electrocardiography, ST waveform analysis (sometimes abbreviated STAN) is used to get an indication of increasing levels of fetal base deficit.

== Related pages ==
- Electrocardiography
- PR interval
- QRS complex
- QT interval
- T wave
- U wave
