= Acute pericarditis =

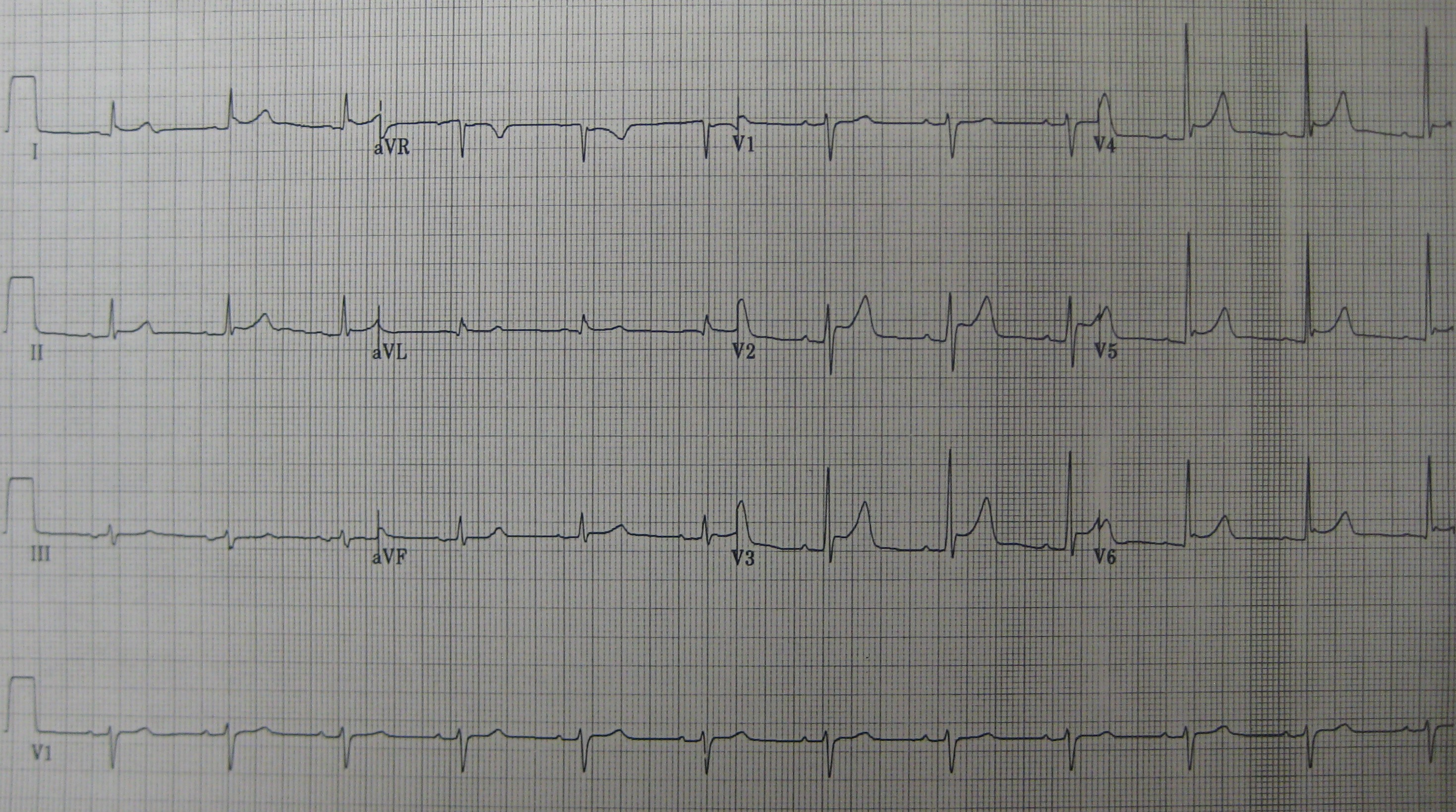
- An ECG showing pericarditis. Note the ST elevation in multiple leads with slight reciprocal ST depression in aVR.
- Specialty: Cardiology

Acute pericarditis is a type of pericarditis (inflammation of the sac surrounding the heart, the pericardium) usually lasting less than 4 to 6 weeks. It is the most common condition affecting the pericardium.

== Signs and symptoms ==
Chest pain is one of the common symptoms of acute pericarditis. It is usually of sudden onset, occurring in the anterior chest and often has a sharp quality that worsens with breathing in or coughing, due to inflammation of the pleural surface at the same time. The pain may be reduced with sitting up and leaning forward, while worsened with lying down, and also may radiate to the back, to one or both trapezius ridges. However, the pain can also be dull and steady, resembling the chest pain in an acute myocardial infarction. As with any chest pain, other causes must also be ruled out, such as GERD, pulmonary embolism, muscular pain, etc.

A pericardial friction rub is a very specific sign of acute pericarditis, meaning the presence of this sign invariably indicates the presence of disease. However, the absence of this sign does not rule out disease. This rub can be best heard by the diaphragm of the stethoscope at the left sternal border, arising as a squeaky or scratching sound, resembling the sound of leather rubbing against each other. This sound should be distinguished from the sound of a murmur, which is similar but sounds more like a "swish" sound than a scratching sound. The pericardial rub is said to be generated from the friction generated by the two inflamed layers of the pericardium; however, even a large pericardial effusion does not necessarily present a rub. The rub is best heard during the maximal movement of the heart within the pericardial sac, namely, during atrial systole, ventricular systole, and the filling phase of early ventricular diastole.

Fever may be present since this is an inflammatory process.

== Causes ==
There are several causes of acute pericarditis. In developed nations, the cause of most (80–90%) cases of acute pericarditis is unknown, but a viral cause is suspected in the majority of such cases. The other 10–20% of acute pericarditis cases have various causes including connective tissue diseases (e.g., systemic lupus erythematosus), cancer, or involve an inflammatory reaction of the pericardium following trauma to the heart such as after a heart attack such as Dressler's syndrome. Familial Mediterranean fever and TNF receptor associated periodic syndrome are rare inherited autoimmune diseases capable of causing recurring episodes of acute pericarditis.

== Pathophysiology ==
Acute pericarditis is an overarching term to describe a set of clinical symptoms and findings associated with inflammation of the pericardium. The initial triggering event is variable and depends on the underlying etiology. In general, an inflammatory stimulus (virus, idiopathic, radiation, surgery) results in an injury that activates the immune system of the body. A structure known as the inflammasome (a large molecule cellular structure) begins to activate other smaller inflammatory molecules known as cytokines that eventually attack and damage the mesothelial cells of the pericardium. The differentiation in symptoms and presentation may depend on the patient-level variation of the adaptive and innate immune system. If a patient has adequate mechanisms to turn off pro-inflammatory processes, the acute pericarditis may not progress. If the immune system is not regulated as well and is allowed to continue activating the inflammasome to damage the mesothelial cells, this may lead to pericardial inflammation. The goal of medical treatment for this condition is to turn off or regulate the patient's inflammatory system.

== Diagnosis ==
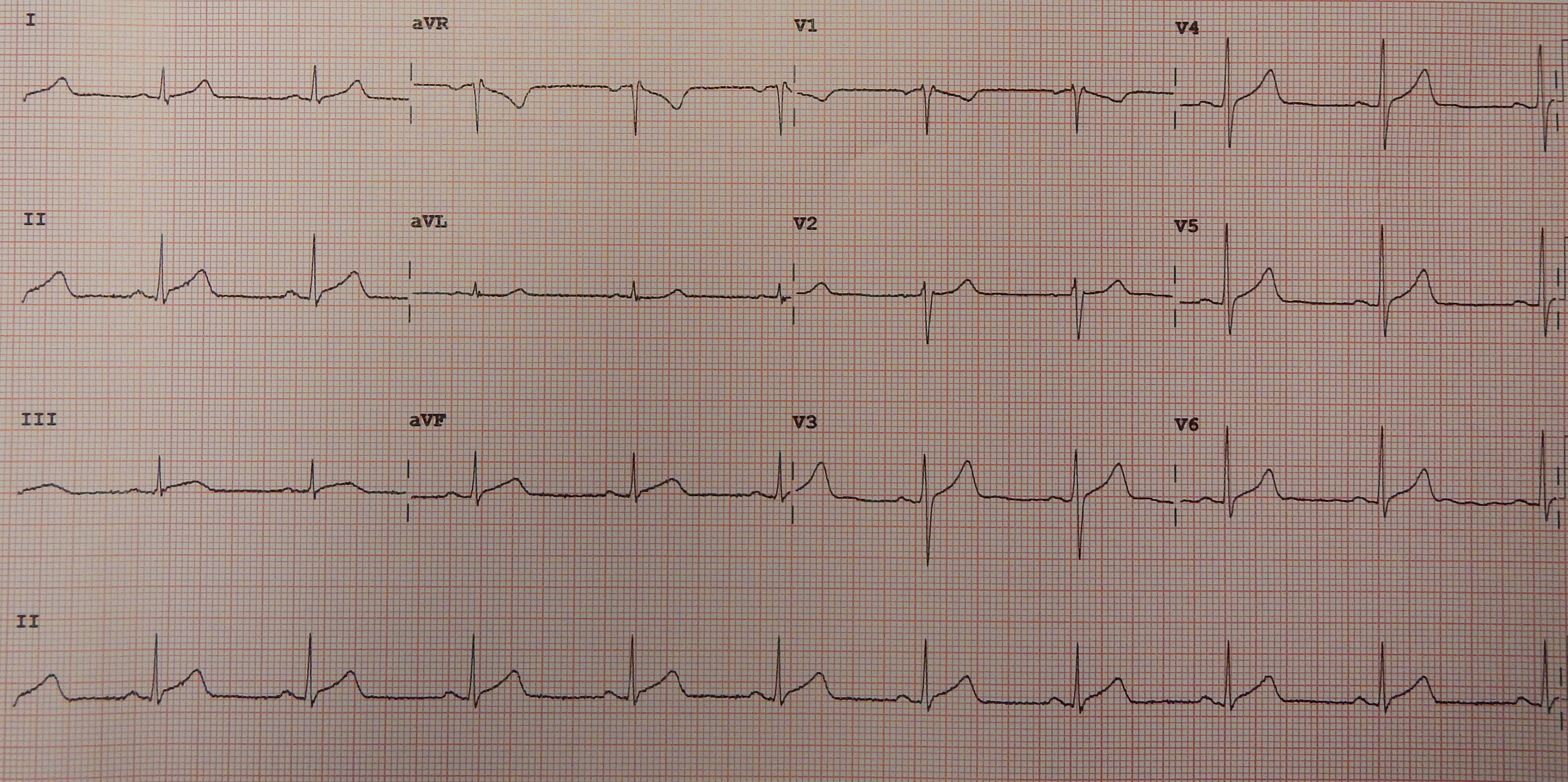
ECG showing slight ST elevation in many leads congruent with pericarditis

For acute pericarditis to formally be diagnosed, two or more of the following criteria must be present: chest pain consistent with a diagnosis of acute pericarditis (sharp chest pain worsened by breathing in or a cough), a pericardial friction rub, a pericardial effusion, and changes on electrocardiogram (ECG) consistent with acute pericarditis.

A complete blood count may show an elevated white count, and a serum C-reactive protein may be elevated. Acute pericarditis is associated with a modest increase in serum creatine kinase MB (CK-MB). and cardiac troponin I (cTnI), both of which are also markers for injury to the muscular layer of the heart. Therefore, it is imperative to also rule out acute myocardial infarction in the face of these biomarkers. The elevation of these substances may occur when inflammation of the heart's muscular layer in addition to acute pericarditis. Also, ST elevation on EKG (see below) is more common in those patients with a cTnI > 1.5 μg/L. Coronary angiography in those patients should indicate normal vascular perfusion. Troponin levels increase in 35-50% of people with pericarditis.

Electrocardiogram (ECG) changes in acute pericarditis mainly indicate inflammation of the epicardium (the layer directly surrounding the heart), since the fibrous pericardium is electrically inert. For example, in uremia, there is no inflammation in the epicardium, only fibrin deposition, and therefore, the EKG in uremic pericarditis will be normal. Typical EKG changes in acute pericarditis includes

- stage 1 -- diffuse, positive, ST elevations with reciprocal ST depression in aVR and V1. Elevation of the PR segment in aVR and depression of the PR in other leads, especially the left heart V5, V6 leads, indicate atrial injury.
- stage 2 -- normalization of ST and PR deviations
- stage 3 -- diffuse T wave inversions (may not be present in all patients)
- stage 4 -- EKG becomes normal, or T waves may be indefinitely inverted

The two most common clinical conditions where ECG findings may mimic pericarditis are acute myocardial infarction (AMI) and generalized early repolarization. As opposed to pericarditis, AMI usually causes localized convex ST-elevation usually associated with reciprocal ST-depression which may also be frequently accompanied by Q-waves, T-wave inversions (while ST is still elevated unlike pericarditis), arrhythmias and conduction abnormalities. In AMI, PR-depressions are rarely present. Early repolarization usually occurs in young males (age <40 years), and ECG changes are characterized by terminal R-S slurring, temporal stability of ST-deviations, and J-height/ T-amplitude ratio in V5 and V6 of <25%, as opposed to pericarditis, where terminal R-S slurring is very uncommon and J-height/ T-amplitude ratio is ≥ 25%. Very rarely, ECG changes in hypothermia may mimic pericarditis; differentiation can be helpful with a detailed history and the presence of an Osborne wave in hypothermia.

Another important diagnostic electrocardiographic sign in acute pericarditis is the Spodick sign. It signifies to the PR-depressions in a usual (but not always) association with downsloping TP segment in patients with acute pericarditis and is present in up to 80% of the patients affected with acute pericarditis. The sign is often best visualized in lead II and lateral precordial leads. In addition, Spodick's sign may also serve as an important distinguishing electrocardiographic tool between acute pericarditis and acute coronary syndrome. The presence of a classical Spodick's sign is often a giveaway to the diagnosis.

Rarely, electrical alternans may be seen, depending on the size of the effusion.

A chest x-ray is usually normal in acute pericarditis, but can reveal the presence of an enlarged heart if a pericardial effusion is present and is greater than 200 mL in volume. Conversely, patients with unexplained new onset cardiomegaly should always be worked up for acute pericarditis.

An echocardiogram is typically normal in acute pericarditis but can reveal a pericardial effusion, the presence of which supports the diagnosis, although its absence does not exclude it.

== Differential Diagnoses ==
There are many causes of acute pericarditis, so the first step in differentiating it is to take a thorough patient history to identify likely and unlikely causes. To diagnose acute idiopathic pericarditis, one must rule out all other causes of acute pericarditis (diagnosis of exclusion).

Common diagnoses to rule out when considering acute idiopathic pericarditis include the following:

Pericarditis secondary to post-cardiac injury: Differentiate this from acute idiopathic pericarditis by timing. If the pericarditis results a few days or weeks post acute myocardial infarction, trauma to the chest wall, cardiac surgery, or other cardiac perforation causes pericarditis secondary to post-cardiac injury is most likely the diagnosis.

Pericarditis secondary to autoimmune disease: Differentiate idiopathic pericarditis from common autoimmune diseases that present with pericarditis as just one of many complications. This list includes, systemic lupus erythematosus, rheumatoid arthritis, scleroderma, dermatomyositis, polymyositis, mixed connective tissue disease, vasculitis, Inflammatory bowel disease, sarcoidosis, Behçet's disease, Still disease, Immunoglobulin G4-related diseases, Erheim-Chester disease, polyarteritis nodosa, etc. Can be done by evaluating labs such as ANA, ESR, anti-rheumatoid factor, Anti-SSA/Ro, Anti-SSB/La, and p-ANCA/c-ANCA and so on

Pericarditis secondary to drug toxicity: Pericarditis can result from the following medications: Procainamide, isoniazid, hydralazine, and cyclosporine.

Pericarditis secondary to metabolic derangements: Differentiate pericarditis from causes resulting from both excretion of waste, such as uremia (dialysis associated) as well as from endocrine function including hyperthyroidism, hypothyroidism, cholesterol and anorexia. This can be obtained from a basic CMP, TSH and T4 levels.

Pericarditis secondary to infection: Differentiate between viral, bacterial, fungal, and/or protozoal. Evaluate if the patient has a fever, chills, sepsis, or any other evidence of infection.

Pericarditis secondary to malignancy: Differentiate the result of acute pericarditis arising from invasion/activation of the immune system from a tumor such as malignant melanoma, lymphoma, leukemia, or solid tumors. If a pericardial effusion is present, malignant cells are often found in the pericardial fluid.

== Treatment ==
Patients with uncomplicated acute pericarditis can generally be treated and followed up in an outpatient clinic. However, those with high risk factors for developing complications (see above) will need to be admitted to an inpatient service, most likely an ICU setting. High-risk patients include the following:

- subacute onset
- high fever (> 100.4 F/38 C) and leukocytosis
- development of cardiac tamponade
- large pericardial effusion (echo-free space > 20 mm) resistant to NSAID treatment
- immunocompromised
- history of oral anticoagulation therapy
- acute trauma
- failure to respond to seven days of NSAID treatment

Pericardiocentesis is a procedure whereby the fluid in a pericardial effusion is removed through a needle. It is performed under the following conditions:

- presence of moderate or severe cardiac tamponade
- diagnostic purpose for suspected purulent, tuberculosis, or neoplastic pericarditis
- persistent symptomatic pericardial effusion

NSAIDs in viral or idiopathic pericarditis. In patients with underlying causes other than viral, the specific etiology should be treated. With idiopathic or viral pericarditis, NSAID is the mainstay treatment. Goal of therapy is to reduce pain and inflammation. The course of the disease may not be affected. The preferred NSAID is ibuprofen because of rare side effects, better effect on coronary flow, and larger dose range. Depending on severity, dosing is between 300 and 800 mg every 6–8 hours for days or weeks as needed. An alternative protocol is aspirin 800 mg every 6–8 hours. Dose tapering of NSAIDs may be needed. In pericarditis following acute myocardial infarction, NSAIDs other than aspirin should be avoided since they can impair scar formation. As with all NSAID use, GI protection should be engaged. Failure to respond to NSAIDs within one week (indicated by persistence of fever, worsening of condition, new pericardial effusion, or continuing chest pain) likely indicates that a cause other than viral or idiopathic is in process.

Colchicine, which has been essential to treat recurrent pericarditis, has been supported for routine use in acute pericarditis by recent prospective studies. Colchicine can be given 0.6 mg twice a day (0.6 mg daily for patients <70 kg) for 3 months following an acute attack. It should be considered in all patients with acute pericarditis, preferably in combination with a short-course of NSAIDs. For patients with a first episode of acute idiopathic or viral pericarditis, they should be treated with an NSAID plus colchicine 1–2 mg on first day followed by 0.5 daily or twice daily for three months. It should be avoided or used with caution in patients with severe chronic kidney disease, hepatobiliary dysfunction, blood dyscrasias, and gastrointestinal motility disorders.

Corticosteroids are usually used in those cases that are clearly refractory to NSAIDs and colchicine and a specific cause has not been found. Systemic corticosteroids are usually reserved for those with autoimmune disease.

== Clinical Complications ==
Clinical complications of acute pericarditis may vary between:

- Acute and recurrent pericarditis
- Pericardial effusion without major hemodynamic compromise
- Cardiac tamponade
- Constrictive pericarditis
- Effusive-constrictive pericarditis

== Prognosis ==
One of the most feared complications of acute pericarditis is cardiac tamponade. Cardiac tamponade is accumulation of enough fluid in the pericardial space --- pericardial effusion --- to cause serious obstruction to the inflow of blood to the heart. Signs of cardiac tamponade include distended neck veins, muffled heart sounds when listening with a stethoscope, and low blood pressure (together known as Beck's triad). This condition can be fatal if not immediately treated.

Another longer term complication of pericarditis, if it recurs over a longer period of time (normally more than 3 months), is progression to constrictive pericarditis. Recent studies have shown this to be an uncommon complication. The definitive treatment for constrictive pericarditis is pericardial stripping, which is a surgical procedure where the entire pericardium is peeled away from the heart.
