= ST elevation =

Elevation of the ST segment on an electrocardiogram

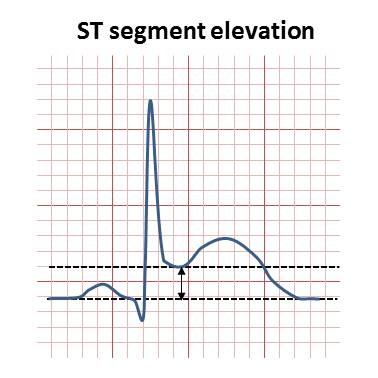
Illustration of ST segment elevation

ST elevation is a finding on an electrocardiogram wherein the trace in the ST segment is abnormally high above the baseline.

== Electrophysiology ==
The ST segment starts from the J point (termination of QRS complex and the beginning of ST segment) and ends with the T wave. The ST segment is the plateau phase, in which the majority of the myocardial cells had gone through depolarization but not repolarization. The ST segment is the isoelectric line because there is no voltage difference across cardiac muscle cell membrane during this state. Any distortion in the shape, duration, or height of the cardiac action potential can distort the ST segment.

== Abnormalities ==
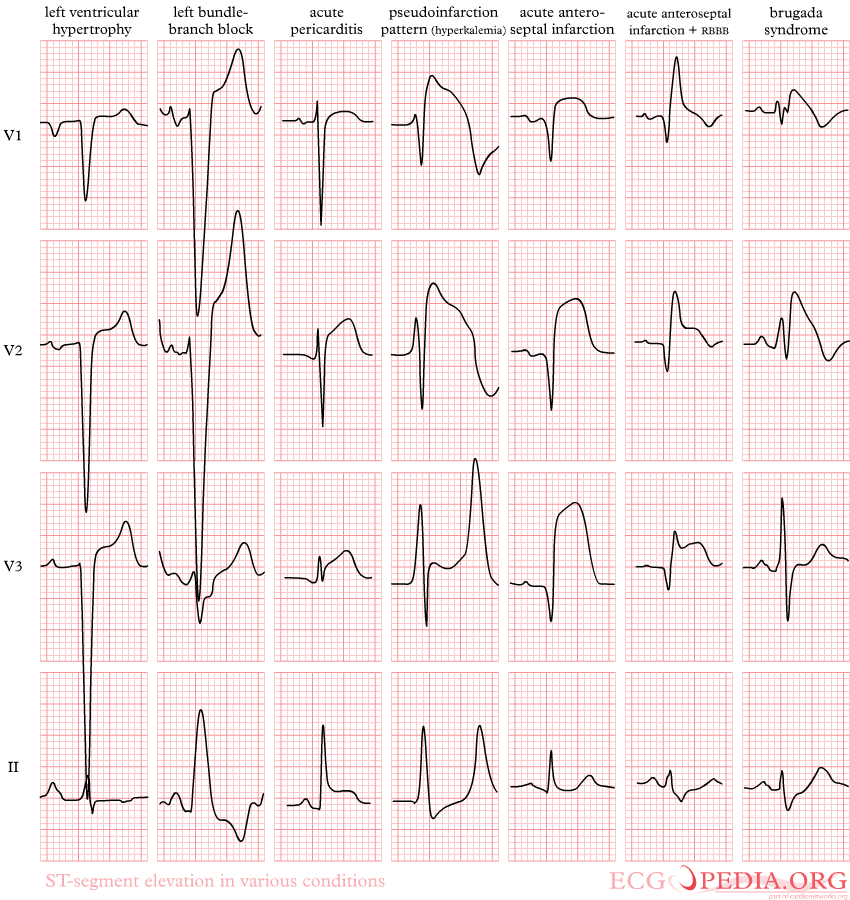
Examples of pathologic ST elevation. LVH, LBBB, Pericarditis, Hyperkalemia, Anterior AMI, Brugada syndrome.

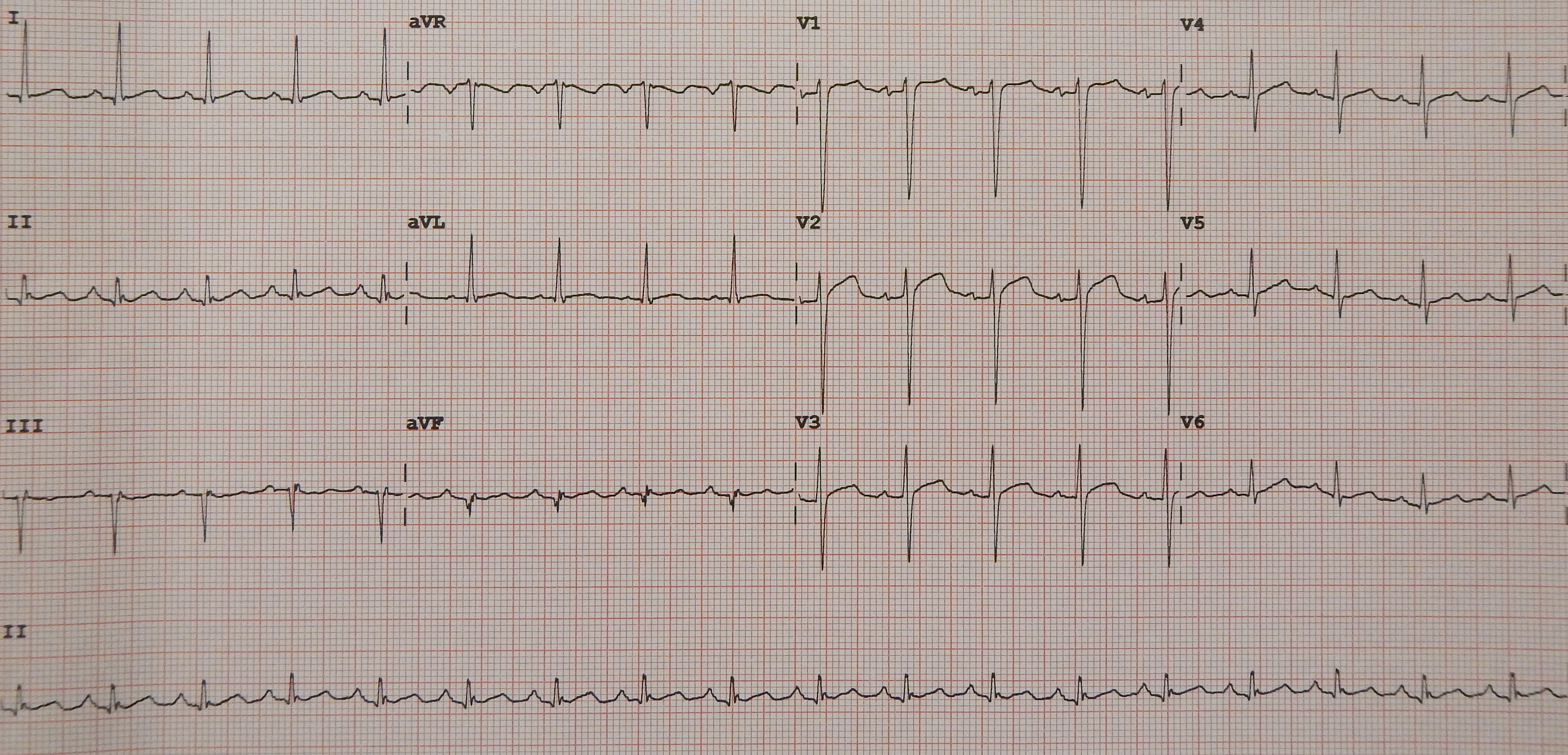
An example of mildly elevated ST segments in V1 to V3 that are concave down

An ST elevation is considered significant if the vertical distance inside the ECG trace and the baseline at a point 0.04 seconds after the J-point is at least 0.1 mV (usually representing 1 mm or 1 small square) in a limb lead or 0.2 mV (2 mm or 2 small squares) in a precordial lead. The baseline is either the PR interval or the TP interval. This measure has a false positive rate of 15–20% (which is slightly higher in women than men) and a false negative rate of 20–30%.

=== Myocardial infarction ===
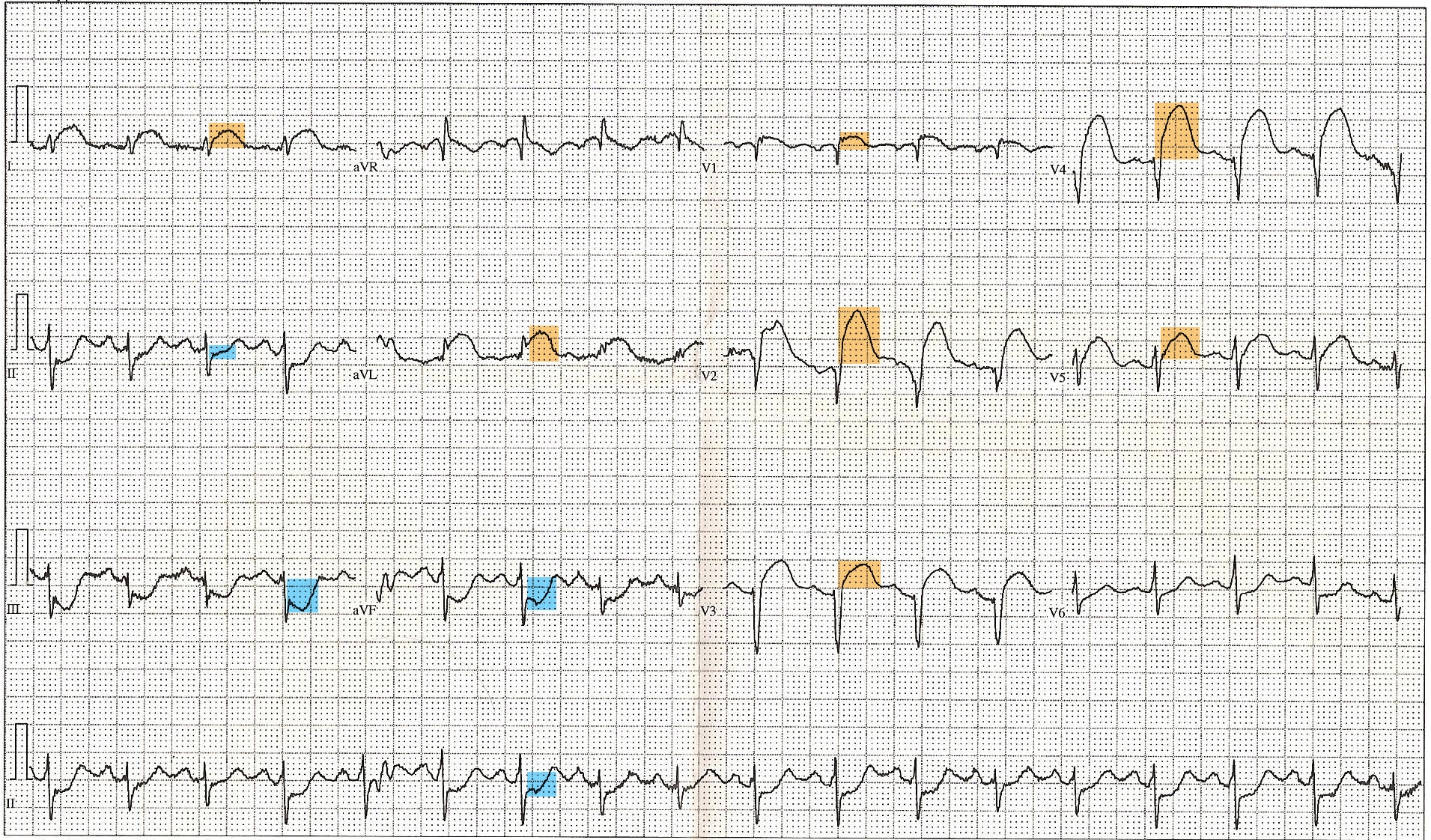
12-lead electrocardiogram showing ST-segment elevation (orange) in I, aVL and V1–V5 with reciprocal changes (blue) in the inferior leads, indicative of an anterior wall myocardial infarction.

When there is a blockage of the coronary artery, there will be lack of oxygen supply to all three layers of cardiac muscle (transmural ischemia). The leads facing the injured cardiac muscle cells will record the action potential as ST elevation during systole while during diastole, there will be depression of the PR segment and the TP segment. Since PR and TP interval are regarded as baseline, ST segment elevation is regarded as a sign of myocardial ischemia. The opposing leads (such as V3 and V4 versus posterior leads V7–V9) always show reciprocal ST segment changes (ST elevation in one lead is followed by ST depression in the opposing lead). This is highly specific for myocardial infarction. An upsloping, convex ST segment is highly predictive of a myocardial infarction (Pardee sign) while a concave ST elevation is less suggestive and can be found in other non-ischemic causes. Following infarction, ventricular aneurysm can develop, which leads to persistent ST elevation, loss of S wave, and T wave inversion.

Weakening of the electrical activity of the cardiac muscles causes the decrease in height of the R wave in those leads facing it. In opposing leads, it manifests as Q wave. However, Q waves may be found in healthy individuals at lead I, aVL, V5 and V6 due to left to right depolarisation.

=== Myocarditis/pericarditis ===
In these conditions, there will mostly be concave ST elevations in almost all the leads except for aVR and V1. These two leads, ST depression will be seen because they are the opposing leads of the cardiac axis. PR segment depression is highly suggestive of pericarditis. R wave in most cases will be unaltered. In two weeks after pericarditis, there will be upward concave ST elevation, positive T wave, and PR depression. After several more weeks, PR and ST segments normalised with flattened T wave. At last, there will be T wave inversion which will take weeks or months to vanish.

== Associated conditions ==
The topology and distribution of the affected areas depend on the underlying condition. Thus, ST elevation may be present on all or some leads of ECG.

It can be associated with:

- Myocardial infarction (see also ECG in myocardial infarction). ST elevation in select leads is more common with myocardial infarction. ST elevation only occurs in full thickness infarction
- Prinzmetal's angina
- Acute pericarditis ST elevation in all leads (diffuse ST elevation) is more common with acute pericarditis.
- Left ventricular aneurysm
- Blunt trauma to the chest resulting in a cardiac contusion
- Hyperkalemia
- Acute myocarditis
- Pulmonary embolism
- Brugada syndrome
- Hypothermia
- J-point elevation
- Early repolarization
- Subarachnoid hemorrhage

== See also ==
- ST segment
- ST depression
