= History of continuous noninvasive arterial pressure =

The article reviews the evolution of continuous noninvasive arterial pressure measurement (CNAP). The historical gap between ease of use, but intermittent upper arm instruments and bulky, but continuous “pulse writers” (sphygmographs) is discussed starting with the first efforts to measure pulse, published by Jules Harrison in 1835. Such sphygmographs led a shadowy existence in the past, while Riva Rocci's upper arm blood pressure measurement started its triumphant success over 100 years ago. In recent times, CNAP measurement introduced by Jan Penáz in 1973 enabled the first recording of noninvasive beat-to-beat blood pressure resulting in marketed products such as the Finapres™ device and its successors. Recently, a novel method for CNAP monitoring has been designed for patient monitoring in perioperative, critical and emergency care, where blood pressure needs to be measured repeatedly or even continuously to facilitate the best care for patients.

== Early sphygmographs ==
Prior to quantitative measurement, which was applied in medicine in the 19th century, diagnostic possibilities of hemodynamic activities had been limited to qualitative sensing of pulse through palpation. In some cultures, sensitive palpation is still a main part of medicine like pulse diagnosis in Traditional Chinese medicine (TCM) or the identification of the ayurvedic doshas. The introduction of the stethoscope and the methods of auscultation by René-Théophile-Hyacinthe Laennec in 1816 changed the medical behavior consistently and forced the need of quantitative hemodynamic measurements.

The first instrument which could measure the force of pulse with a mercury filled glass tube was developed by Jules Harrison in 1835. Jean Léonard Marie Poiseuille invented the first mercury “Hemodynameter”, a forerunner of the sphygmomanometer in 1821.

The first sphygmograph (pulse writer) for the continuous graphical registration of pulse dates back to Karl von Vierordt in 1854. More popular, however, was the improved sphygmograph from the French physiologist and pioneer in cinematography Étienne-Jules Marey (1863). In his famous book “La méthode graphique“ (1878) and his studies with the photographic gun, Marey's work was related to cardiovascular movements of heart and vessels.

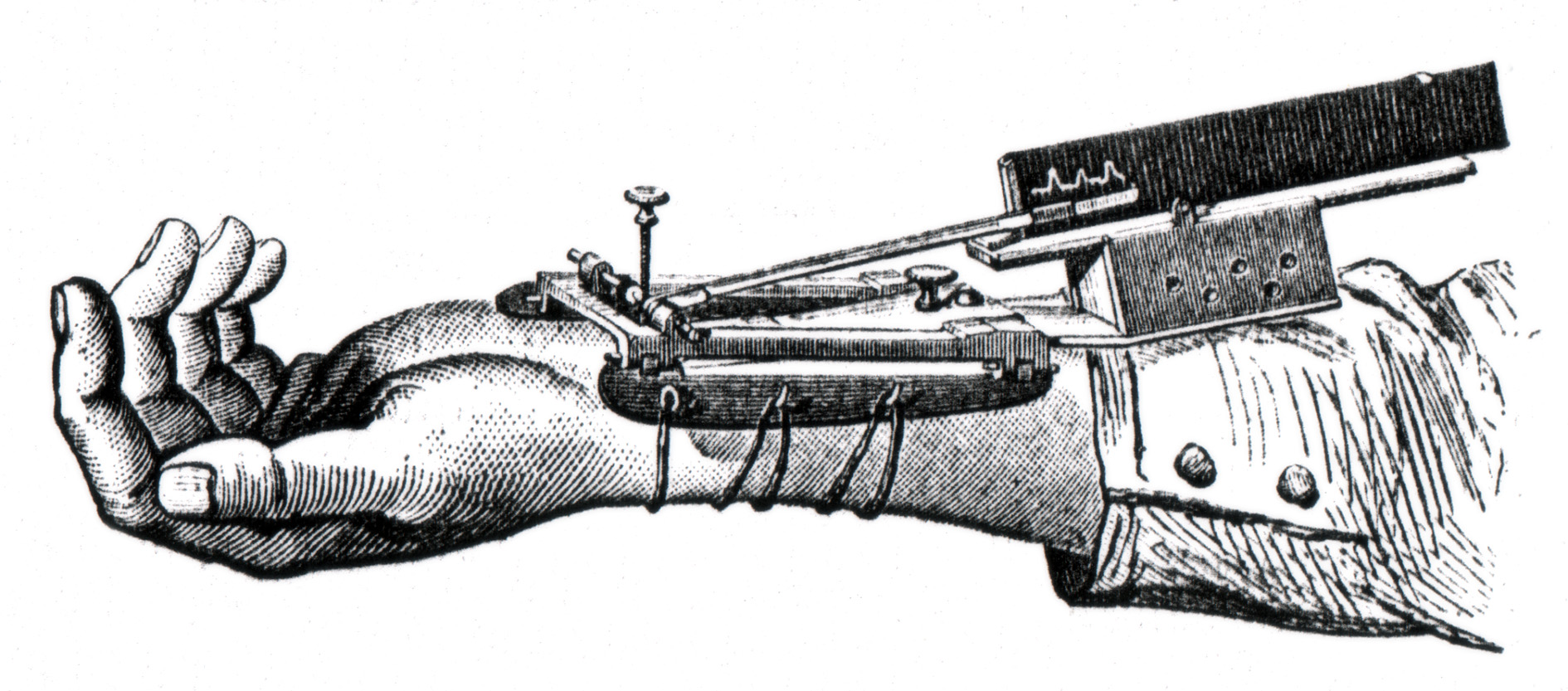
Marey's sphygmograph – note the registration unit at the top right, where one can see the blood pressure waveforms obtained from the set of levers at the wrist

Besides Marey's sphygmograph, a device developed by the Austrian Samuel von Basch attracted attention and was introduced in Europe in 1880 . A fluid filled bladder placed on the wrist was able to detect pulse; the pressure, which was necessary for the disappearance of the pulses, was measured with a mercury manometer. This allowed the first measurement of systolic blood pressure. Several other sphygmographs were developed in the late 19th century, especially in Great Britain, France and Germany. These instruments were portable, reasonably accurate and widely available, so physicians even used them at the bedside.

== Simple and accurate sphygmomanometers displace sphygmographs ==
In 1896, the Italian Scipione Riva-Rocci introduced the first mercury-sphygmomanometer placed on the upper arm. It enabled the measurement of absolute systolic blood pressure. Since the finding of the characteristic sounds by the Russian Nikolai Sergejev Korotkoff in 1905, the upper arm method also allows the registration of absolute diastolic blood pressure.

One year after Riva-Rocci's findings, Leonard Erskine Hill and Harold Barnard reported blood pressure monitoring during anesthesia for the first time. Their almost concurrently invented devices consisted of a narrow armlet to occlude the brachial artery, a small bicycle-type metal pump and a metal manometer graduated in mmHg. It seems surprising that the first report of blood pressure monitoring during anesthesia did not mention the use of sphygmographs, which had already been in common use at this time . One reason might be that the former practice totally relied on the observation of breathing as the sole method of monitoring; even the palpation of pulse during ether or chloroform administration was not recognized as a good practice. Another reason may be found directly in the title of the report: “A simple and accurate form of sphygmometer or arterial pressure gauge contrived for clinical use” – implying that for clinical use the device must be simple and accurate.

== Early vascular unloading technique ==
While the sphygmomanometer had started its triumphant advance, only a few pulse registration devices were invented in the 20th century. Plain plethysmographic devices like pulse oximeters are, of course, the exception, but they cannot be used for blood pressure measurement. If at all, they can measure blood volume changes. These volume changes cannot easily be transformed into pressure, because the elastic components of the arterial wall are not linear and the smooth muscles also consist of non-elastic parts..

The goal is to unload the arterial wall in order to linearize this phenomenon with a counter pressure as high as the pressure inside the artery. Blood volume is kept constant by applying this corresponding pressure from the outside. The continuously changing outside pressure that is needed to keep the arterial blood volume constant directly corresponds to the arterial pressure. It is an instantaneous, continuous measure for arterial blood pressure, which is the basic principle of the so-called “vascular unloading technique”.

In 1942, the German physiologist Richard Wagner introduced a mechanical system for the identification of blood pressure at the arteria radialis using a mechanical version of the vascular unloading technique, where a counter pressure unloads the arterial wall.

== Electro-pneumatic vascular unloading technique ==
The Czech physiologist Jan Peňáz introduced the vascular unloading technique on the finger in 1973 by means of an electro-pneumatic control loop. The control loop is shown in the block diagram: a cuff is placed over the finger, as it is the most suitable and an easily accessible region. Inside the cuff, the blood volume in the finger arteries is measured using an infrared light source (L) and a light detecting photocell (PC). The plethysmographic signal (PG) – the light signal compared to constant C1 – is an electronic measure for finger blood volume. PG is fed into a control unit having proportional-integral-differential characteristics (PID). The PID-signal is added to a constant set point (C2), amplified and fed to an electro-pneumatic transducer (EPT). EPT produces a pressure in the cuff, which, again, alters finger blood volume.

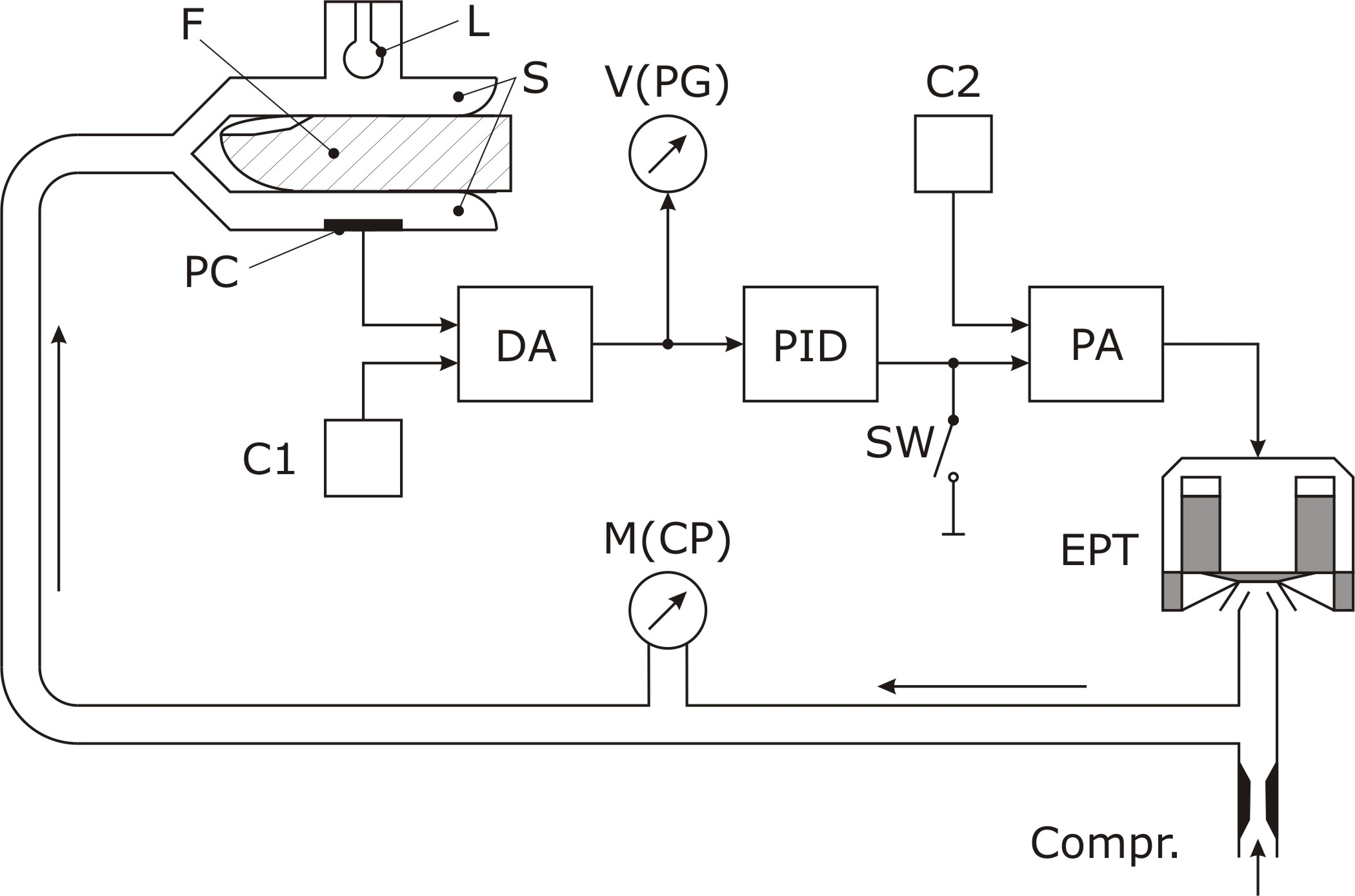
Block diagram of Peňáz’ system with single control loop: F – finger, L – lamp, PC – photo cell, S – segments of transparent pressure cuff, C_{1}– average of PC-signal, DA – difference amplifier, V(PG) – plethysmographic signal, PID – correcting network, C_{2} – set point SP, SW – switch between open and closed loop, PA – power amplifier, EPT – electro-pneumatic transducer, M(CP) Pressure measured with Manometer. (Constructed with respect to Peňáz’ original drawing).

The condition of the control loop can be described as follows: The light-signal PG shall become zero by controlling the alterable pressure in the cuff. During systole, when blood volume increases in the finger, the PID-controller increases the control point. Thus, cuff pressure is increased until the excess blood volume is squeezed out. On the other hand, during diastole, the blood volume in the finger is decreased; as a result the PID-controller decreases the control point. Hence, cuff pressure is lowered and the overall blood volume remains constant. As blood volume and thus PG is held constant over time, the pressure difference between cuff pressure and intra-arterial pressure is zero. Intra-arterial pressure is equal to cuff pressure, which can easily be measured by means of the manometer M.

Peňáz used a single electronic control loop, which was responsible for the fast tracking of blood pressure changes as well as for the stability of the system. However, the changes in arterial diameter and in wall tension due to vasoconstriction and vasodilatation make a long-term measurement with this single control loop almost impossible, since the true unloading of the arterial wall is easily lost Therefore, groups in the Netherlands, Japan, Australia and Austria have improved the Peňáz principle of vascular unloading.

=== Finapres and its successors ===
An innovative evolution of Peňáz’ principle was the Finapres™, which was developed by the Dutch group around K.H. Wesseling and introduced to the market in 1986. Successors of the Finapres systems on the medical market are the Finometer, the Portapres as well as the Nexfin.

=== Digital CNAP-technology ===
Starting in 1996, an Austrian research group has developed a completely digital approach of the method. As a result, this technology can be found in the Task Force Monitor and CNAP Monitor 500 (CNSystems) as well as in the CNAP Smart Pod (Dräger Medical) and in the LiDCOrapid (LiDCO Ltd.).

Whereas other technologies still use one single control loop, the digital CNAP-technology is based on concentrically interlocking control loops. These loops enable beat-to-beat correction of changes in vasomotor tone using the VERIFI-algorithm.

== Tonometry ==
Tonometry is the resurrection of the old sphygmograph technology as it again describes a mechanism for the automatic noninvasive palpation on the arteria radialis. In order to obtain a stable blood pressure signal, the tonometric sensor must be protected against movement and other mechanical artifacts.

== Pulse transit time ==
When the heart ejects stroke volume to the arteries, it takes a certain transit time until the blood volume reaches the periphery. This pulse transit time (PTT) indirectly depends on blood pressure. This circumstance can be used for the noninvasive detection of blood pressure changes.

== Pulse Decomposition Analysis ==
The arterial pressure pulse in the upper body is composed of five constituent pulses: the left ventricular ejection pulse, a reflection of this pulse that is known as the second systolic pulse and that arises from the diameter mismatch between thoracic/abdominal aortas, another reflection of it in the iliac arteries that forms the diastolic pulse, and two more re-reflections that arise between these reflection sites and that can typically only be observed in subjects with low arterial stiffness and long cardiac cycles. Using PDA, the pressure profile of each heart pulse is analyzed for changes in systolic, diastolic, and mean arterial pressure as well as other hemodynamic parameters. PDA systems offer very low coupling pressures to a finger and track blood pressures for long periods. Like tonometers and PTT methods, the measurement can be optionally calibrated with an absolute blood pressure from a reference method. One commercially available PDA method has shown acceptable accuracy compared to an invasive arterial line.
