= Blood pressure measurement =

Techniques for determining blood pressure

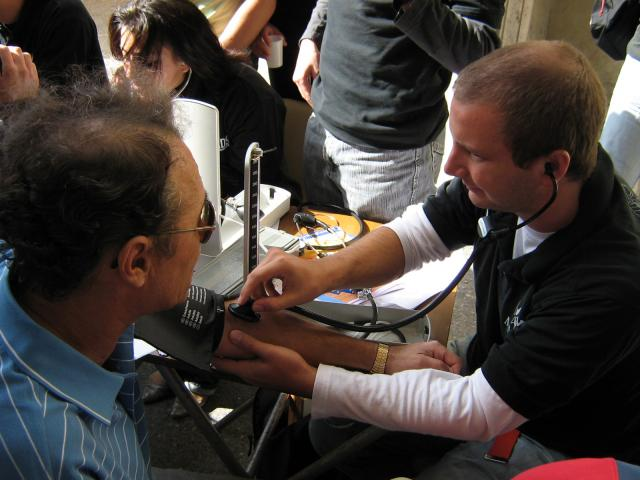
- A medical student checking blood pressure using a sphygmomanometer and stethoscope.
- Test of: Blood pressure
- Based on: CNAP vascular unloading technique
- MedlinePlus: 007490

Right position for taking blood pressure

Digital blood pressure monitor in use

Arterial blood pressure is most commonly measured via a sphygmomanometer, which historically used the height of a column of mercury to reflect the circulating pressure. Blood pressure values are generally reported in millimetres of mercury (mmHg), though modern aneroid and electronic devices do not contain mercury.

For each heartbeat, blood pressure varies between systolic and diastolic pressures. Systolic pressure is peak pressure in the arteries, which occurs near the end of the cardiac cycle when the ventricles are contracting. Diastolic pressure is minimum pressure in the arteries, which occurs near the beginning of the cardiac cycle when the ventricles are filled with blood. An example of normal measured values for a resting, healthy adult human is 120 mmHg systolic and 80 mmHg diastolic (written as 120/80 mmHg, and spoken as "one-twenty over eighty"). The difference between the systolic and diastolic pressures is referred to as pulse pressure (not to be confused with pulse rate/heartrate) and has clinical significance in a wide variety of situations. It is generally measured by first determining the systolic and diastolic pressures and then subtracting the diastolic from the systolic. Mean arterial pressure is the average pressure during a single cardiac cycle and, although it is possible to measure directly using an arterial catheter, it is more commonly estimated indirectly using one of several different mathematical formulas once systolic, diastolic, and pulse pressures are known.

Systolic and diastolic arterial blood pressures are not static but undergo natural variations from one heartbeat to another and throughout the day (in a circadian rhythm). They also change in response to stress, nutritional factors, drugs, disease, exercise, and momentarily from standing up. Sometimes the variations are large. Hypertension refers to arterial pressure being abnormally high, as opposed to hypotension, when it is abnormally low. Along with body temperature, respiratory rate, and pulse rate, blood pressure is one of the four main vital signs routinely monitored by medical professionals and healthcare providers.

Measuring pressure invasively, by penetrating the arterial wall to take the measurement, is much less common and usually restricted to a hospital setting.

== Non-invasive ==
The non-invasive auscultatory and oscillometric measurements are simpler and quicker than invasive measurements, require less expertise, have virtually no complications, are less unpleasant and less painful for the patient. However, non-invasive methods may yield somewhat lower accuracy and small systematic differences in numerical results. Non-invasive measurement methods are more commonly used for routine examinations and monitoring. New non-invasive and continuous technologies based on the CNAP vascular unloading technique, are making non-invasive measurement of blood pressure and further advanced hemodynamic parameters more applicable in general anesthesia and surgery where periods of hypotension might be missed by intermittent measurements.

=== Palpation ===
A minimum systolic value can be roughly estimated by palpation, most often used in emergency situations, but should be used with caution. It has been estimated that, using 50% percentiles, carotid, femoral and radial pulses are present in patients with a systolic blood pressure > 70 mmHg, carotid and femoral pulses alone in patients with systolic blood pressure of > 50 mmHg, and only a carotid pulse in patients with a systolic blood pressure of > 40 mmHg.

A more accurate value of systolic blood pressure can be obtained with a sphygmomanometer and palpating the radial pulse. Methods using constitutive models have been proposed to measure blood pressure from radial artery pulse. The diastolic blood pressure cannot be estimated by this method. The American Heart Association recommends that palpation be used to get an estimate before using the auscultatory method.

=== Auscultatory ===
Measuring systolic and diastolic blood pressure using a mercury sphygmomanometer

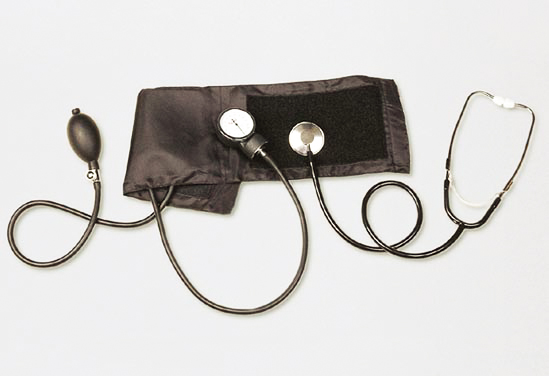
Auscultatory method aneroid sphygmomanometer with stethoscope

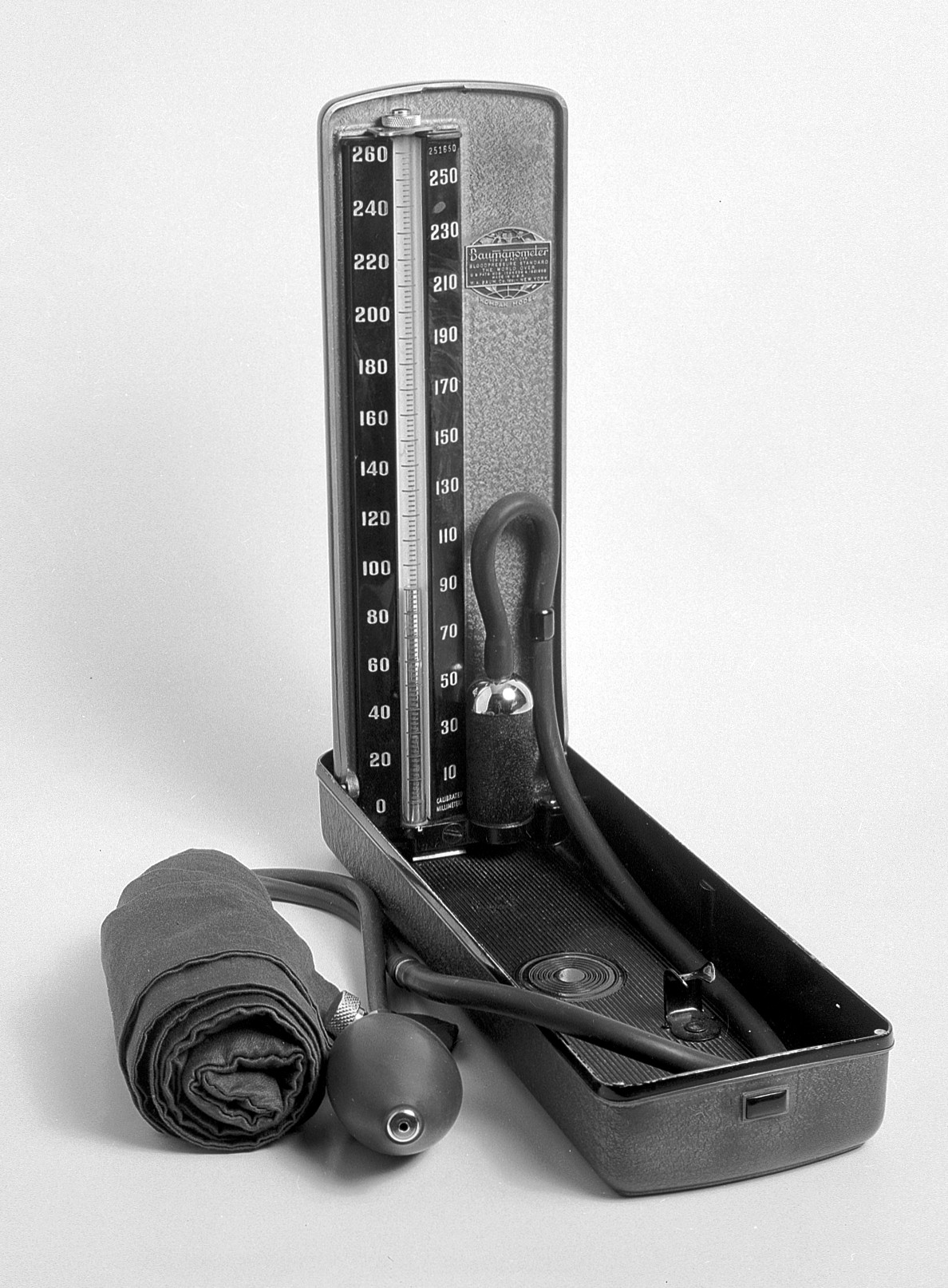
Mercury manometer

The auscultatory method (from the Latin word for "listening") uses a stethoscope and a sphygmomanometer. This comprises an inflatable (Riva-Rocci) cuff placed around the upper arm at roughly the same vertical height as the heart, attached to a mercury or aneroid manometer. The mercury manometer, considered the gold standard, measures the height of a column of mercury, giving an absolute result without need for calibration and, consequently, not subject to the errors and drift of calibration which affect other methods. The use of mercury manometers is often required in clinical trials and for the clinical measurement of hypertension in high-risk patients, such as pregnant women.

A cuff of the appropriate size is fitted snugly, then inflated manually by repeatedly squeezing a rubber bulb until the artery is completely occluded. It is important that the cuff size is correct: undersized cuffs record too high a pressure; oversized cuffs may yield too low a pressure. Usually three or four cuff sizes should be available to allow measurements in arms of different size. Listening with the stethoscope to the brachial artery at the antecubital area of the elbow, the examiner slowly releases the pressure in the cuff. When blood just starts to flow in the artery, the turbulent flow creates a "whooshing" or pounding (first Korotkoff sound). The pressure at which this sound is first heard is the systolic blood pressure. The cuff pressure is further released until no sound can be heard (fifth Korotkoff sound), at the diastolic arterial pressure.

The auscultatory method is the predominant method of clinical measurement.

=== Oscillometric ===
The oscillometric method was first demonstrated in 1876 and involves the observation of oscillations in the sphygmomanometer cuff pressure which are caused by the oscillations of blood flow, i.e., the pulse. The electronic version of this method is sometimes used in long-term measurements and general practice. The first fully automated oscillometric blood pressure cuff called the Dinamap 825, an acronym for "Device for Indirect Non-invasive Mean Arterial Pressure", was made available in 1976. It was replaced in 1978 by the Dinamap 845 which could also measure systolic and diastolic blood pressure, as well as heart rate.

The oscillometric method uses a sphygmomanometer cuff, like the auscultatory method, but with an electronic pressure sensor (transducer) to observe cuff pressure oscillations, electronics to automatically interpret them, and automatic inflation and deflation of the cuff. The pressure sensor should be calibrated periodically to maintain accuracy. Oscillometric measurement requires less skill than the auscultatory technique and may be suitable for use by untrained staff and for automated patient home monitoring. As for the auscultatory technique it is important that the cuff size is appropriate for the arm. There are some single cuff devices that may be used for arms of differing sizes, although experience with these is limited.

The cuff is inflated to a pressure initially in excess of the systolic arterial pressure and then reduced to below diastolic pressure over a period of about 30 seconds. When blood flow is nil (cuff pressure exceeding systolic pressure) or unimpeded (cuff pressure below diastolic pressure), cuff pressure will be essentially constant. When blood flow is present, but restricted, the cuff pressure, which is monitored by the pressure sensor, will vary periodically in synchrony with the cyclic expansion and contraction of the brachial artery, i.e., it will oscillate.

Over the deflation period, the recorded pressure waveform forms a signal known as the cuff deflation curve. A bandpass filter is utilized to extract the oscillometric pulses from the cuff deflation curve. Over the deflation period, the extracted oscillometric pulses form a signal known as the oscillometric waveform (OMW). The amplitude of the oscillometric pulses increases to a maximum and then decreases with further deflation. A variety of analysis algorithms can be employed in order to estimate the systolic, diastolic, and mean arterial pressure.

Oscillometric monitors may produce inaccurate readings in patients with heart and circulation problems, which include arteriosclerosis, arrhythmia, preeclampsia, pulsus alternans, and pulsus paradoxus.

In practice the different methods do not give identical results; an algorithm and experimentally obtained coefficients are used to adjust the oscillometric results to give readings which match the auscultatory results as well as possible. Some equipment uses computer-aided analysis of the instantaneous arterial pressure waveform to determine the systolic, mean, and diastolic points. Since many oscillometric devices have not been validated, caution must be given as most are not suitable in clinical and acute care settings.

Recently, several coefficient-free oscillometric algorithms have developed for estimation of blood pressure. These algorithms do not rely on experimentally obtained coefficients and have been shown to provide more accurate and robust estimation of blood pressure. These algorithms are based on finding the fundamental relationship between the oscillometric waveform and the blood pressure using modeling and learning approaches. Pulse transit time measurements have been also used to improve oscillometric blood pressure estimates.

The term NIBP, for non-invasive blood pressure, is often used to describe oscillometric monitoring equipment.

=== Continuous noninvasive techniques ===
Continuous Noninvasive Arterial Pressure (CNAP) is the method of measuring beat-to-beat arterial blood pressure in real-time without any interruptions and without cannulating the human body. CNAP combines the advantages of the two clinical gold standards: it measures blood pressure continuously in real-time like the invasive arterial catheter system and it is noninvasive like the standard upper arm sphygmomanometer. Latest developments in this field show promising results in terms of accuracy, ease of use and clinical acceptance. An advanced hemodynamic monitoring system incorporating the CNAP method is the NICCI technology of the company Pulsion Medical Systems. The system uses photoplethysmography to detect the blood flow in the patient's fingers and pressure cuffs to create a constant flow. The resulting pressure in the finger sensor corresponds to the real arterial pressure. Based on the vascular unloading technique, the NICCI Technology provides continuous and noninvasive hemodynamic parameters during surgeries. The measurement results are comparable to invasive arterial line measurements in terms of continuity, accuracy and waveform dynamics.

Recent developments have proposed continuous, noninvasive, non-contact blood pressure measurements using systems such as cameras to monitor the human face.

Blood pressure monitoring during cardiopulmonary resuscitation

Blood pressure monitoring during cardiopulmonary resuscitation (CPR) has been investigated as a physiologic indicator of resuscitation quality. Observational studies in both pediatric and adult cardiac arrest populations have demonstrated that achieving adequate diastolic blood pressure (DBP) during chest compressions is associated with improved return of spontaneous circulation (ROSC) and survival outcomes. In pediatric in-hospital cardiac arrest, maintaining a mean DBP of at least 25 mmHg in infants and 30 mmHg in children has been associated with improved survival to discharge and favorable neurological outcomes. Sutton RM, French B, Niles DE, et al. Association between diastolic blood pressure during pediatric in-hospital cardiopulmonary resuscitation and survival. Circulation. 2018;137(17):1784–1795. In adult out-of-hospital cardiac arrest, higher follow-up DBP values and increases in DBP during CPR have been independently associated with sustained ROSC.Kim JS, Kim YJ, Hong SI, et al. Diastolic blood pressures and end tidal carbon dioxides during cardiopulmonary resuscitations and their association with outcomes in adult out-of-hospital cardiac arrest patients: A preplanned secondary analysis of the AMCPR trial. Resuscitation. 2024.

Traditional non-invasive cuff systems are limited in this setting due to intermittent measurement cycles and reduced accuracy at low arterial pressures, while invasive arterial monitoring requires catheter placement and specialized personnel.Celler BG, Yong A, Rubenis I, et al. Accurate detection of Korotkoff sounds reveals large discrepancy between intra-arterial systolic pressure and simultaneous noninvasive measurement of blood pressure with brachial cuff sphygmomanometry. J Hypertens. 2024. As a result, research efforts have explored methods capable of providing continuous or near-continuous DBP monitoring during resuscitation.

=== Pulse wave velocity ===
Since the 1990s a novel family of techniques based on the so-called pulse wave velocity (PWV) principle have been developed. These techniques rely on the fact that the velocity at which an arterial pressure pulse travels along the arterial tree depends, among others, on the underlying blood pressure. Accordingly, after a calibration maneuver, these techniques provide indirect estimates of blood pressure by translating PWV values into blood pressure values. The main advantage of these techniques is that it is possible to measure PWV values of a subject continuously (beat-by-beat), without medical supervision, and without the need of continuously inflating brachial cuffs.

=== Ambulatory and home monitoring ===
Ambulatory blood pressure devices take readings regularly (e.g. every half-hour throughout the day and night). They have been used to exclude measurement problems like white-coat hypertension and provide more reliable estimates of usual blood pressure and cardiovascular risk. Blood pressure readings outside of a clinical setting are usually slightly lower in the majority of people; however studies that quantified the risks from hypertension and the benefits of lowering blood pressure have mostly been based on readings in a clinical environment. Use of ambulatory measurements is not widespread but guidelines developed by the UK National Institute for Health and Care Excellence and the British Hypertension Society recommended that 24-hour ambulatory blood pressure monitoring should be used for diagnosis of hypertension. Health economic analysis suggested that this approach would be cost effective compared with repeated clinic measurements. Not all home blood pressure machines are accurate, and "wide range" (one-size fits all) home blood pressure monitoring units do not have adequate evidence to support their use. In addition, health care professionals are recommending that people validate their home devices before relying on the results.

Home monitoring is a cheap and simple alternative to ambulatory blood pressure monitoring, although it does not usually allow assessment of blood pressure during sleep which may be a disadvantage. Automatic self-contained blood pressure monitors are available at reasonable prices, however measurements may not be accurate in patients with atrial fibrillation or other arrhythmias such as frequent ectopic beats. Home monitoring may be used to improve hypertension management and to monitor the effects of lifestyle changes and medication related to blood pressure. Compared to ambulatory blood pressure measurements, home monitoring has been found to be an effective and lower cost alternative, but ambulatory monitoring is more accurate than both clinic and home monitoring in diagnosing hypertension.

When measuring blood pressure in the home, an accurate reading requires that one not drink coffee, smoke cigarettes, or engage in strenuous exercise for 30 minutes before taking the reading. A full bladder may have a small effect on blood pressure readings; if the urge to urinate arises, one should do so before the reading. For 5 minutes before the reading, one should sit upright in a chair with one's feet flat on the floor and with limbs uncrossed. The blood pressure cuff should always be against bare skin, as readings taken over a shirt sleeve are less accurate. The same arm should be used for all measurements. During the reading, the arm that is used should be relaxed and kept at heart level, for example by resting it on a table.

Since blood pressure varies throughout the day, home measurements should be taken at the same time of day. A Joint Scientific Statement From the American Heart Association, American Society of Hypertension, and Preventive Cardiovascular Nurses Association on home monitoring in 2008 recommended that 2 to 3 readings should be taken in the morning (after awakening, before washing/dressing, taking breakfast/drink or taking medication) and another 2 to 3 readings at night, each day over a period of 1 week. It was also recommended that the readings from the first day should be discarded and that a total of ≥12 readings (i.e. at least two readings per day for the remaining 6 days of the week) should be used for making clinical decisions.

=== Observer error ===
There are many factors that can play a role in the blood pressure reading by physician, such as hearing problem, auditory perception of the physician. Karimi Hosseini et al. evaluated the interobserver differences among specialists without any auditory impairment, and reported 68% of observers recorded systolic blood pressure in a range of 9.4 mmHg, diastolic blood pressure in a range of 20.5 mmHg and mean blood pressure in a range of 16.1mmHg. Neufeld et al. reported standard deviations for both systolic and diastolic readings were roughly 3.5 to 5.5 mm Hg. In general standard deviation for the diastolic pressure would be greater because of the difficulty in judging when the sounds disappear.

=== White-coat hypertension ===
For some patients, blood pressure measurements taken in a doctor's office may not correctly characterize their typical blood pressure. In up to 25% of patients, the office measurement is higher than their typical blood pressure. This type of error is called white-coat hypertension (WCH) and can result from anxiety related to an examination by a health care professional. White coat hypertension can also occur because, in a clinical setting, patients are seldom given the opportunity to rest for five minutes before blood pressure readings are taken. The misdiagnosis of hypertension for these patients can result in needless and possibly harmful medication. WCH can be reduced (but not eliminated) with automated blood pressure measurements over 15 to 20 minutes in a quiet part of the office or clinic. In some cases a lower blood pressure reading occurs at the doctor's – this has been termed 'masked hypertension'.

Alternative settings, such as pharmacies, have been proposed as alternatives to office blood pressure monitoring.

== Invasive ==
Arterial blood pressure is most accurately measured invasively through an arterial line. Invasive arterial pressure measurement with intravascular cannulae involves direct measurement of arterial pressure by placing a cannula needle in an artery (usually radial, femoral, dorsalis pedis or brachial). The cannula is inserted either via palpation or with the use of ultrasound guidance.

The cannula must be connected to a sterile, fluid-filled system, which is connected to an electronic pressure transducer. The advantage of this system is that pressure is constantly monitored beat-by-beat, and a waveform (a graph of pressure against time) can be displayed. This invasive technique is regularly employed in human and veterinary intensive care medicine, anesthesiology, and for research purposes.

Cannulation for invasive vascular pressure monitoring is infrequently associated with complications such as thrombosis, infection, and bleeding. Patients with invasive arterial monitoring require very close supervision, as there is a danger of severe bleeding if the line becomes disconnected. It is generally reserved for patients where rapid variations in arterial pressure are anticipated. Approximately one-third of intensive care patients receive invasive arterial monitoring.

Invasive vascular pressure monitors are pressure monitoring systems designed to acquire pressure information for display and processing. There are a variety of invasive vascular pressure monitors for trauma, critical care, and operating room applications. These include single pressure, dual pressure, and multi-parameter (i.e. pressure / temperature). The monitors can be used for measurement and follow-up of arterial, central venous, pulmonary arterial, left atrial, right atrial, femoral arterial, umbilical venous, umbilical arterial, and intracranial pressures.

=== Central aortic blood pressure measurement ===
Central aortic blood pressure, which, compared to peripheral blood pressure, has been shown to correlate more strongly with negative cardiovascular events, kidney disease, and other morbidities, as well as all-cause mortality, has traditionally required invasive heart catheterization to be measured, but newer devices have either been developed or are in late stages of development that allow it to be non-invasively measured indirectly with an acceptable margin of error.
