= Mean arterial pressure =

Average blood pressure in an individual during a single cardiac cycle

- Representation of the arterial pressure waveform over one cardiac cycle. The notch in the curve is associated with closing of the aortic valve.
- MeSH: D062186

Mean arterial pressure (MAP) is an average calculated blood pressure in an individual during a single cardiac cycle. Although methods of estimating MAP vary, a common calculation is to take one-third of the pulse pressure (the difference between the systolic and diastolic pressures), and add that amount to the diastolic pressure. A normal MAP for adults is about 90 mmHg.

MAP is altered by cardiac output and systemic vascular resistance. It is used to estimate the risk of cardiovascular diseases, where a MAP of 90 mmHg or less is low risk, and a MAP of greater than 96 mmHg represents "stage one hypertension" with increased risk.

== Basic calculation ==
The mean arterial pressure is calculated as the sum of the diastolic blood pressure plus the difference of the systolic pressure to the diastolic pressure, with the difference divided by three, as shown in the equation below.

For example, a diastolic pressure of 70 mm Hg and a systolic pressure of 100 mm Hg would yield by means of the calculator below a MAP of 80 mm Hg.

Mean arterial pressure = diastolic blood pressure + ((systolic blood pressure - diastolic blood pressure))/3

Systolic blood pressure	mmHg
Diastolic blood pressure	mmHg
Mean arterial pressure (MAP)	mmHg

== Testing ==
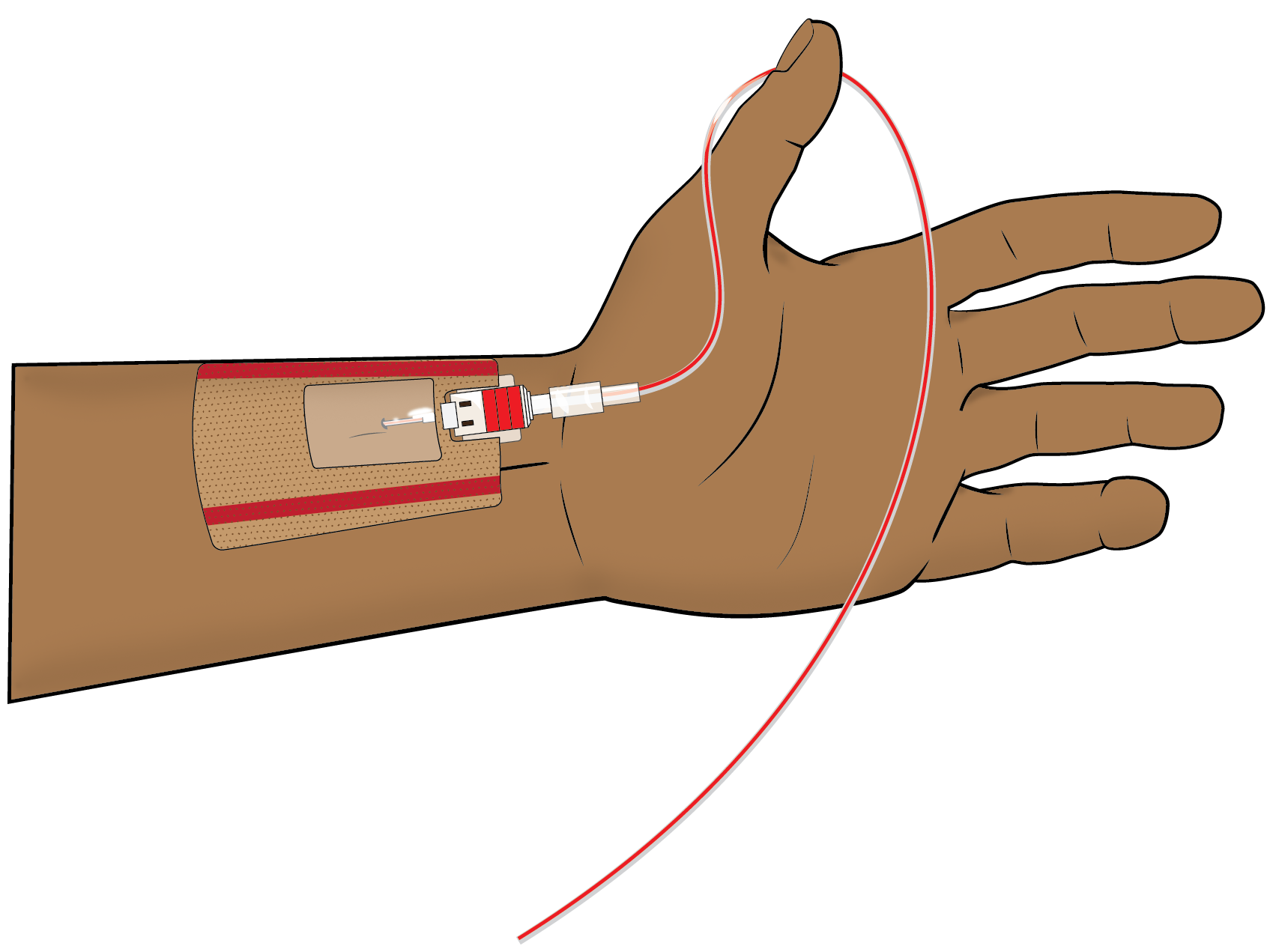
Arterial line

Mean arterial pressure can be measured directly or estimated from systolic and diastolic blood pressure by using a formula.

In the direct approach, mean arterial pressure can be calculated exactly using an arterial catheter with a transducer; this device inserted into the bloodstream measures arterial pressure over time.

A less exact but less invasive approach is to use a blood pressure cuff or an oscillometric blood pressure device to determine systolic and diastolic blood pressure; these values can be plugged into a formula to estimate mean arterial pressure.

== Estimating ==
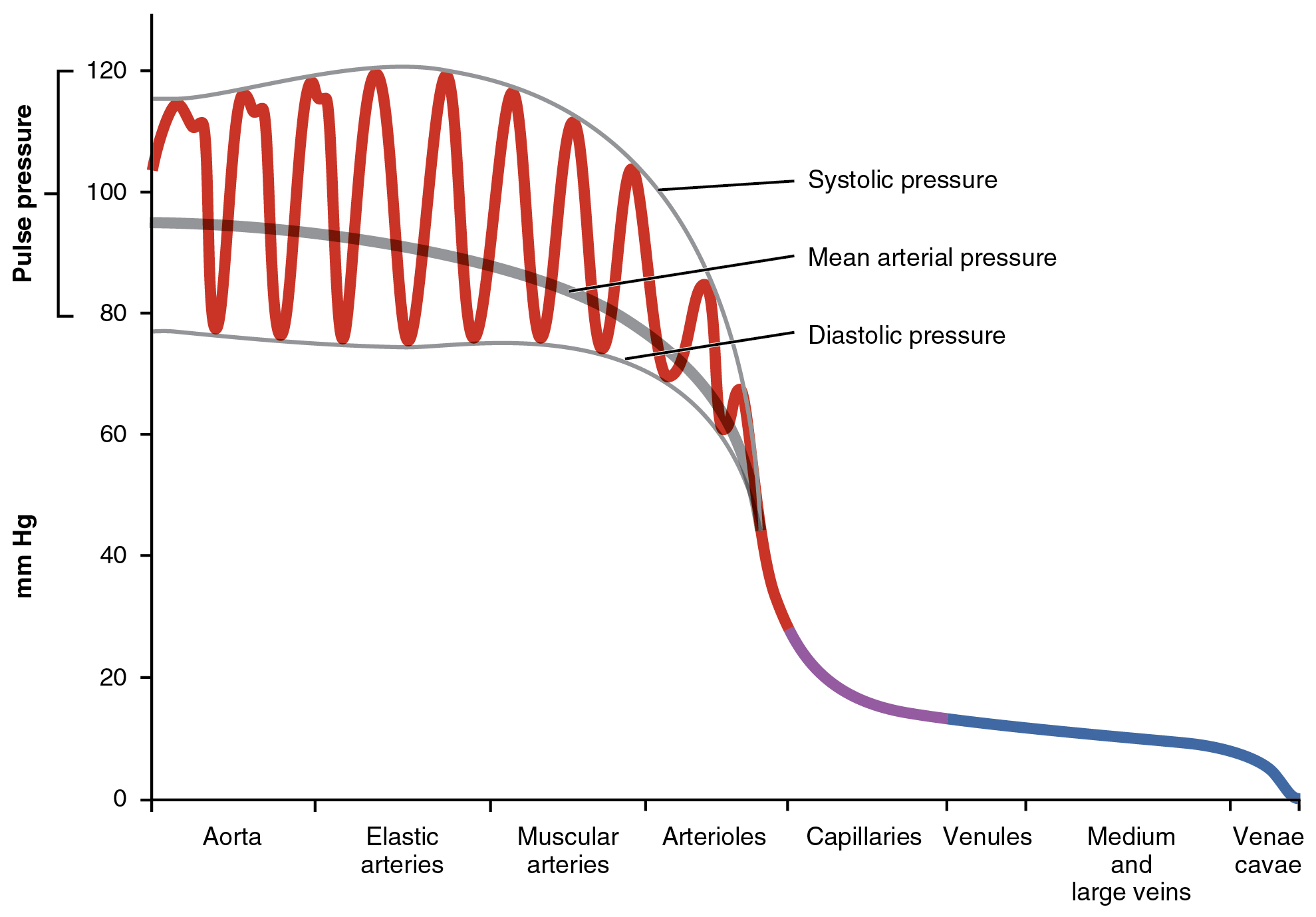
Mean arterial pressure in relation to systolic and diastolic pressure in blood vessels

While MAP can only be measured directly by invasive monitoring, there are several formulas for estimating MAP in terms of easy-to-measure quantities such as systolic and diastolic blood pressure.

One common formula is to double the lower (diastolic) blood pressure, add it to the higher (systolic) blood pressure, and divide the resulting sum by 3 to estimate MAP:

$MAP \approx (2DP+SP)/3 = (2/3)DP+(1/3)SP$

This is equivalent to taking one-third of the pulse pressure (systolic minus diastolic pressure) and adding it to the diastolic pressure:

$MAP \approx DP+1/3(SP-DP)$

where:

- DP = diastolic pressure
- SP = systolic pressure
- MAP = mean arterial pressure

Systolic pressure minus diastolic pressure equals the pulse pressure which may be substituted in.

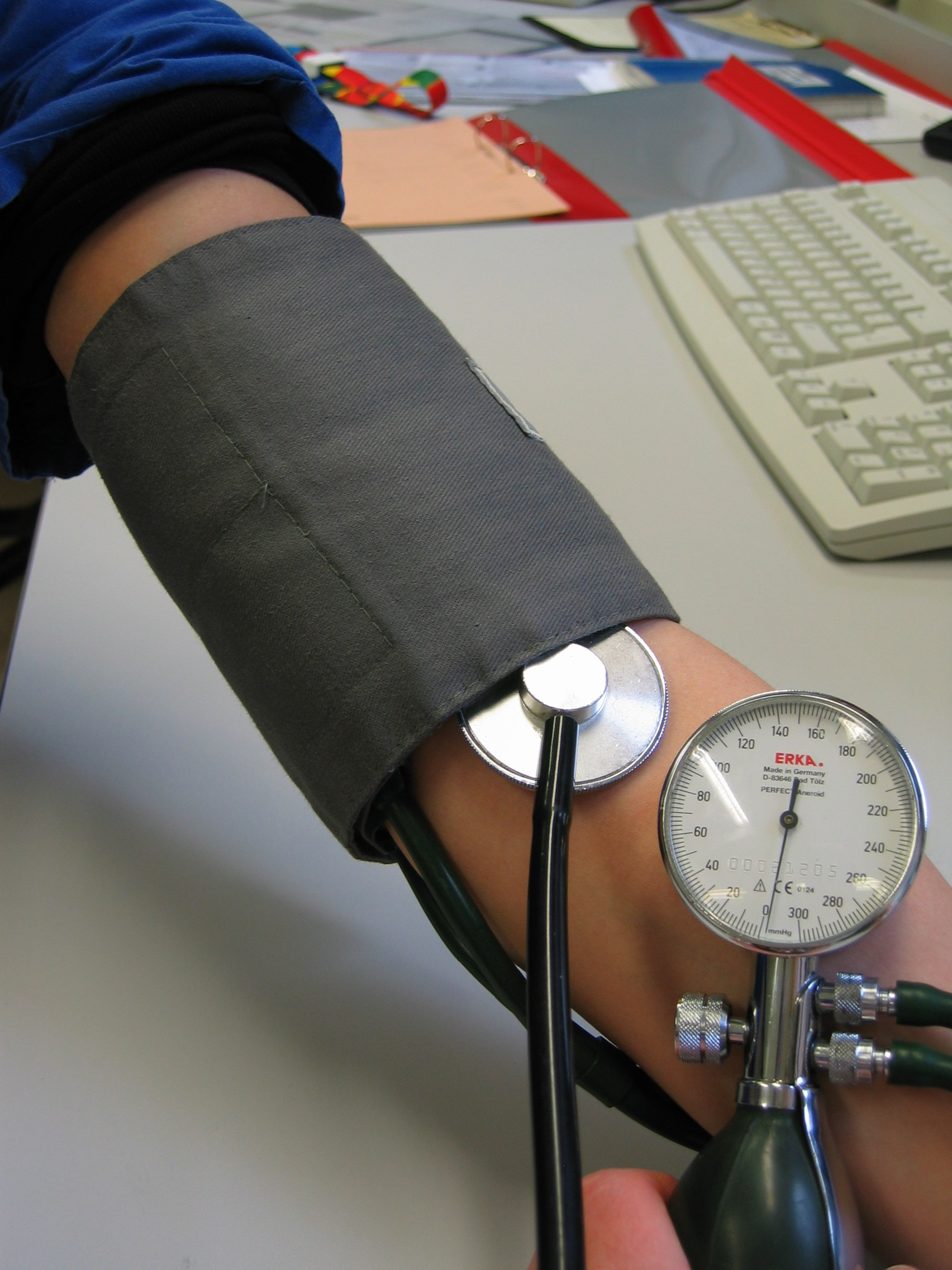
Blood pressure cuff

Another way to find the MAP is to use the systemic vascular resistance equated ($R$), which is represented mathematically by the formula

$$R = \Delta P/Q$$

where $\Delta P$ is the change in pressure across the systemic circulation from its beginning to its end and $Q$ is the flow through the vasculature (equal to cardiac output).

In other words:

$SVR = (MAP - CVP) / CO$

Therefore, MAP can be determined by rearranging the equation to:

$$MAP = (CO \cdot SVR) + CVP$$

where:

- $CO$ is cardiac output
- $SVR$ is systemic vascular resistance
- $CVP$ is central venous pressure and usually is small enough to be neglected in this formula.

$MAP \approx CO \cdot SVR$

This is only valid at normal resting heart rates during which $MAP$ can be approximated using the measured systolic ($SP$) and diastolic ($DP$) blood pressures.

=== Elevated heart rate ===
At high heart rates $MAP$ is more closely approximated by the arithmetic mean of systolic and diastolic pressures because of the change in shape of the arterial pressure pulse.

For a more accurate formula of $MAP$ for elevated heart rates use:

$$MAP \simeq DP + 0.01 \times \exp(4.14 - 40.74 / HR) \times PP$$

Where

- HR = heart rate.
- DP = diastolic pressure
- MAP = mean arterial pressure
- PP = pulse pressure which is systolic minus diastolic pressure

=== Most accurate ===
The version of the MAP equation multiplying 0.412 by pulse pressure and adding diastolic blood pressure is indicated to correlate better than other versions of the equation with left ventricular hypertrophy, carotid wall thickness and aortic stiffness. It is expressed:

$MAP=DBP +(0.412\times PP)$

where:

- DBP = diastolic pressure
- MAP = mean arterial pressure
- PP = pulse pressure

=== Young patients ===
For young patients with congenital heart disease a slight alteration to the factor used found to be more precise. This was written as:

$MAP=DBP +(0.475\times PP)$

where:

- DBP = diastolic pressure
- MAP = mean arterial pressure
- PP = pulse pressure

This added precision means cerebral blood flow can be more accurately maintained in uncontrolled hypertension.

=== Neonates ===
For neonates, because of their altered physiology, a different formula has been proposed for a more precise reading:

$MAP=DBP +(0.466\times PP)$

where:

- DBP = diastolic pressure
- MAP = mean arterial pressure
- PP = pulse pressure

It has also been suggested that when getting readings from a neonates radial arterial line, mean arterial pressure can be approximated by averaging the systolic and diastolic pressure.

=== Other formula versions ===
Other formulas used to estimate mean arterial pressure are:

$MAP=DBP+ (0.33 PP) +5$

or

$MAP=DBP+[0.33+(0.0012 \times HR)]\times PP$

or

$MAP=DAP + PP/3$

or

$MAP = DAP+(PP/3)+5mmHg$

- MAP = mean arterial pressure
- PP = pulse pressure
- DAP = diastolic aortic pressure
- DPB = diastolic blood pressure

== Clinical significance ==
Thresholds for 24 hr. mean arterial pressure (MAP)
24 hr. MAP category	24 hr. MAP
Normal	< 90 mmHg
Elevated blood pressure	90 to < 92 mmHg
Stage 1 hypertension	92 to < 96 mmHg
Stage 2 hypertension	> 96 mmHg

Mean arterial pressure is a major determinant of the perfusion pressure seen by organs in the body. MAP levels greater than 90 mmHg increase the risk stepwise of having higher risk of cardiovascular diseases, such as stroke, and mortality.

=== Hypotension ===
When assessing hypotension, the context of the baseline blood pressure needs to be considered. Acute decreases in mean arterial pressure of around 25% put people at increased risk for organ damage and potential mortality. Even one minute at a MAP of 50 mmHg, or accumulative effects over short periods, increases the risk of mortality by 5%, and can result in organ failure or complications.

In people hospitalized with shock, a MAP of 65 mmHg lasting for more than two hours was associated with higher mortality. In people with sepsis, the vasopressor dosage may be titrated on the basis of estimated MAP.

MAP may be used like systolic blood pressure in monitoring and treating target blood pressure. Both are used as targets for assessing sepsis, major trauma, stroke, and intracranial bleeding.

=== Hypertension ===
In younger people, elevated MAP is used more commonly than pulse pressure in the prediction of stroke. However in older people, MAP is less predictive of stroke and a better predictor of cardiovascular disease.

== See also ==
- Blood pressure
- Hypertension
- Hypotension
- Systemic vascular resistance
- Pulse pressure
- Mean systemic pressure
- Compliance (physiology)
