= Transtek Medical =

Chinese electronics manufacturer

- Native name: 乐心医疗
- Company type: Public
- Traded as: SZSE: 300562
- Founded: 2002
- Founder: Weichao Pan
- Headquarters: Zhongshan
- Products: scales, BP monitors, wearable devices
- Website: transtekmed.com

Transtek Medical (Chinese: 乐心医疗; SZSE: 300562; simply as Transtek), commonly known as Lifesense, fully referred to as Guangdong Transtek Medical Electronics Co., Ltd., is a Chinese wearable device maker that also focuses on the field of mobile health. The company was founded by Weichao Pan in 2002, with its main products being home medical and health electronics, such as scales, smart bracelets and blood pressure monitors.

According to IDC, the company shipped one million units of wearables in the second quarter of 2016, ranking fifth in the global wearable devices market, coming in behind Fitbit, Apple and Garmin. Transtek's IPO application was approved by the CSRC in October 2016. On November 16, it landed on the Shenzhen Stock Exchange with the ticker symbol "300562.SZ".

== History ==
In 2014, Transtek released a health tracking device called "Mambo". It became one of the top five wearable producers worldwide in Q2 2016. In October, the company rolled out the Lifesense Band 2, featuring the collection of heart rate data.

Transtek was listed on the SZSE in November 2016, with Great Wall Securities as its lead underwriter. On October 10, 2017, it signed a cooperation agreement with US-based Cooper Aerobics.

In December 2017, Transtek set up a medical industry fund. In 2019, the company launched its own brand of smart sports watches. Its blood pressure monitors got the 510(k) clearance from the FDA in March 2021.
