= Samuel Siegfried Karl von Basch =

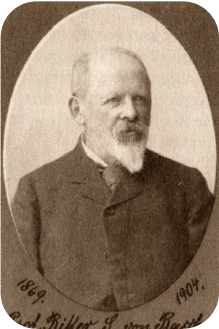
Samuel Siegfried Karl von Basch

Samuel Siegfried Karl Ritter von Basch (9 September 1837, Prague – 25 April 1905) was an Austrian-Jewish (Yekke) physician who was best known as the personal physician of emperor Maximilian of Mexico and the inventor of the blood pressure meter (also known as sphygmomanometer).

Basch was educated at Charles University in Prague and the University of Vienna. From 1857 he studied chemistry at the laboratory of Ernst Wilhelm von Brücke in Vienna, and five years later began the practice of medicine. From that time until 1865 he was assistant to Leopold Ritter von Dittel, Eduard Jäger von Jaxtthal, Ludwig Türck and Eugen Kolisko (1811 – 1884) at the University of Vienna. In 1864, Basch was appointed chief surgeon of the military hospital at Puebla, Mexico. Soon after that, he was appointed as Maximilian's personal physician. Basch remained with Maximilian until the emperor's execution by firing squad at Querétaro on 19 June 1867.

When Maximilian realized that a few days at the most would decide his fate, he commissioned Basch, Lieutenant Ernst Pitner, and Major Becker to keep daily records of all that happened. When the emperor and his entourage were betrayed to Benito Juárez by Colonel Miguel Lopez on 14 May 1867, Basch rushed to saddle his horse, but was at once overpowered by the Mexicans. Basch lost most of his memoranda, saving only cursory notes. After the execution of Maximilian, he returned to Austria with the Emperor's body, arriving on 16 January 1868 on the Novara.

In 1870 Basch was appointed lecturer of experimental pathology at the University of Vienna, and in 1877 assistant professor. He was ennobled by Emperor Franz Joseph I of Austria for his share in Maximilian's enterprise.

== Literary works ==
Basch's best-known work is Erinnerungen aus Mexico (1868), written at the request of Maximilian. In addition, he has written for technical journals a number of articles on the histology of the duodenum, the anatomy of the urinary bladder, and the physiological effects of nicotine.

== Bibliography of Jewish Encyclopedia ==
- - Basch, Erinnerungen aus Mexico, 1868;
  - Pagel, Biog. Lexikon Hervorragender Aerzte, 1901, p. 99;
  - Wernich and Hirsch, Biog. Lexikon Hervorragender Aerzte, 1884, i. 319

== Screen portrayals ==
- Carlos Orellana portrayed Basch in Juárez y Maximiliano (1934).
- Harry Davenport portrayed Basch in Juarez (1939).
- Michael Visaroff portrayed Basch in The Mad Empress (1939).
