= Mean systemic pressure =

Mean pressure in circulatory system without blood motion

In medicine, the mean systemic pressure (MSP) or mean systemic filling pressure (MSFP) is defined as the mean pressure that exists in the circulatory system when there is no blood motion. A similar term, mean circulatory filling pressure, (MCFP) is defined as the mean pressure that exists in the combined circulatory system & pulmonary system when there is no blood motion. The value of MSP in animal experimental models is approximately 7 mm Hg. It is an indicator of how full the circulatory system is (i.e. the volume of blood in the system compared to the capacity of the system), and is influenced by the volume of circulating blood and the smooth muscle tone in the walls of the venous system (which determines the capacity of the system).

MSP is measured in two ways experimentally, and as a result has two alternative naming conventions. MSFP is measured after clamping the aortic root and the great veins at point of entry to right atrium. On the other hand, MCFP is measured experimentally by briefly inducing cardiac arrest or naturally during cardiac arrest once the blood redistributes. It may also be estimated in vivo using a series of inspiratory holds when a patient is on a mechanical ventilator. It can be used to demonstrate effects of drugs on the venous tone while the circulating blood volume remains constant, or to measure haemodynamic changes during haemorrhage.

Mean systemic pressure increases if there is an increase in blood volume or if there is a decrease in venous compliance (where blood is shifted from the veins to the arteries). An increase in mean systemic pressure is reflected in a shift of the vascular function curve to the right. Mean systemic pressure is decreased by a decrease in blood volume or by an increase in venous compliance (where blood is shifted from the arteries to the veins). A decrease in mean systemic pressure is reflected in a shift of the vascular function curve to the left.

== Calculations involving MSP ==
Mean systemic pressure is defined by the stressed volume in the cardiovascular system and the overall systemic capacitance:

$$MSP = \frac{Vs}{Csys}$$

Mean systemic pressure is involved in the following calculations:

$$VR \simeq MSP - RAP$$

- VR = Venous return
- MSP = Mean systemic pressure
- RAP = Right atrial pressure

$$SVR = \frac{MSP - RAP}{CO}$$

- SVR = Systemic vascular resistance
- MSP = Mean systemic pressure
- RAP = Right atrial pressure
- CO = Cardiac output

== See also ==
- Critical closing pressure
- Mean arterial pressure
- Central venous pressure
