= Critical closing pressure =

Pressure below which the blood vessel closes completely

Critical closing pressure is the internal pressure at which a blood vessel collapses and closes completely. When blood pressure falls below critical closing pressure, the vessel is unable to overcome external pressure (either from environment or vascular smooth muscle) and flow stops. An example of this phenomenon is measurement of blood pressure using the "pulse obliteration method" with a sphygmomanometer.

At resting state the arterial critical closing pressure is ~ 20 mmHg.

Critical closing pressure in arteries is higher than the mean vascular filling pressure that develops after death (~7 mmHg). Therefore, arteries collapse after death, then fill up with air once the dissection begins.

In severe haemorrhage, blood loss leads to a significant reduction in circulatory system arterial pressures. This drop in pressure, combined with activity of the sympathetic autonomic nerves supplying vascular smooth muscle, leads to profound vasoconstriction to the extent that the intra-vessel pressure may not overcome the critical closing pressure and subsequently collapse. This abrupts blood supply to tissues, otherwise termed shock.

== See also ==
- Mean systemic pressure
