= Nikolai Korotkov =

Russian surgeon (1874–1920)

Nikolai Korotkov Николай Коротков
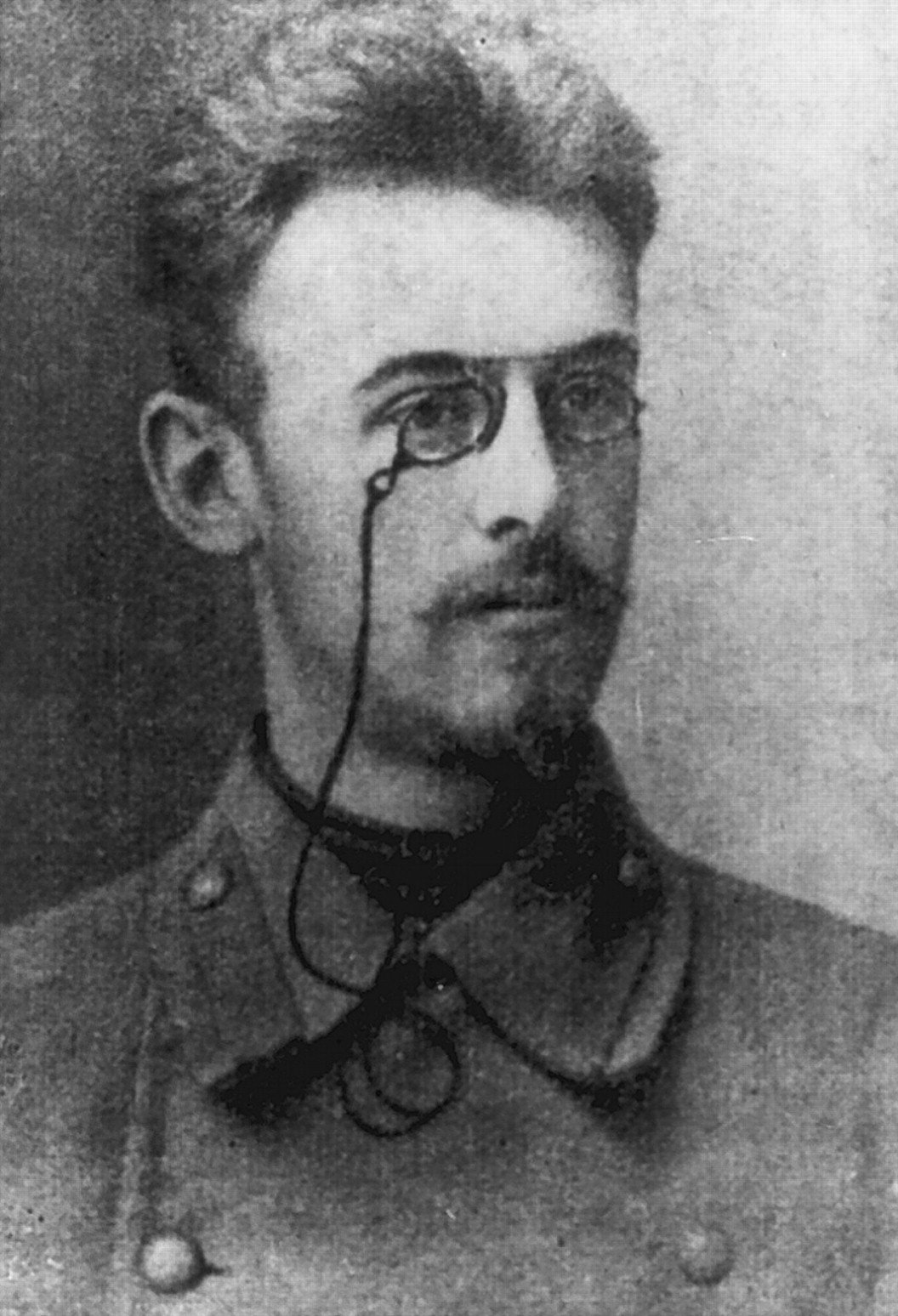
- Nicolai Korotkov in 1900
- Born: 26 February 1874; Kursk, Kursk Governorate, Russian Empire
- Died: 14 March 1920 (aged 46); Petrograd, Russian SFSR, Soviet Union
- Education: Moscow University
- Known for: Invention of auscultatory technique for blood pressure measurement
- Awards: Order of St. Anna
- Scientific career
- Fields: Vascular surgery
- Workplaces: Imperial Military Academy, Mechnikov Hospital (St Petersburg)
- Doctoral advisor: Alexander Bobrov, Sergey Fedorov, M. V. Yanovsky

Nikolai Sergeyevich Korotkov, also Korotkoff (Russian: Никола́й Серге́евич Коротко́в; 26 February [O.S. 14 February] 1874 – 14 March 1920) was a Russian surgeon, a pioneer of 20th-century vascular surgery, and the inventor of auscultatory technique for blood pressure measurement.

== Biography ==
Nikolai Korotkov was born to a merchant family at 40 Milenskaia Street in Kursk on February 26, 1874. He attended the Kursk Gymnasium (secondary school). He entered the medical faculty of Kharkov University in 1893 and transferred to Moscow University in 1895, where he graduated with distinction in 1898. He was appointed resident intern to professor Alexander Bobrov at the surgical clinic of Moscow University.

Korotkov was given leave of absence to serve with the Russian military forces in the Far East during the Boxer Rebellion in China 1900. He was attached to the Red Cross in the Iversh Community under Aleksinskii (a pupil of prof. Bobrov). The journey to the Far East entailed extensive travel by way of the Trans-Siberian railroad, through Irkutsk to Vladivostok and he returned to Moscow via Japan, Singapore, Ceylon and the Suez Canal to reach the Black Sea and Feodosiya. Korotkov was honoured with the Order of St. Anna for "outstandingly zealous labours in helping the sick and wounded soldiers".

On his return Nikolai Korotkov turned his mind from military to academic pursuits and translated Eduard Albert's monograph "Die Chirurgische Diagnostik" from German to Russian. In 1903, Sergey Fedorov was appointed professor of surgery at the Military Medical Academy at St Petersburg, and he invited Korotkov to join him as assistant surgeon. During the Russo-Japanese War in 1904–1905, Korotkov went to Harbin in Manchuria as senior surgeon in charge of the Second St George's Unit of the Red Cross. He became interested in vascular surgery and began to collect cases for his doctoral thesis, which included 41 of 44 case reports of patients who were part of his war experience in the hospital at Harbin.

Returning to St Petersburg in April 1905 he began to prepare his thesis, but it was a presentation to the Imperial Military Medical Academy in 1905 that earned him lasting fame. The technique of blood pressure measurement was reported in less than a page (only 281 words) of the "Izvestie Imp. Voiennomedicinskoi Akademii" (Reports of the Imperial Military Medical Academy):

The cuff of Riva-Rocci is placed on the middle third of the upper arm; the pressure within the cuff is quickly raised up to complete cessation of circulation below the cuff. Then, letting the mercury of the manometer fall one listens to the artery just below the cuff with a children's stethoscope. At first no sounds are heard. With the falling of the mercury in the manometer down to a certain height, the first short tones appear; their appearance indicates the passage of part of the pulse wave under the cuff. It follows that the manometric figure at which the first tone appears corresponds to the maximal pressure. With the further fall of the mercury in the manometer one hears the systolic compression murmurs, which pass again into tones (second). Finally, all sounds disappear. The time of the cessation of sounds indicates the free passage of the pulse wave; in other words at the moment of the disappearance of the sounds the minimal blood pressure within the artery predominates over the pressure in the cuff. It follows that the manometric figures at this time correspond to the minimal blood pressure.

The critical comments of Korotkov's peers were dealt with in an adroit manner, and he appeared a month later at the Imperial Military Academy with animal experiments to support his theory that the sounds he had described were produced locally, rather than in the heart. He earned the approbation of professor M. V. Yanovsky, who declared: "Korotkov has noticed and intelligently utilised a phenomenon which many observers have overlooked." Yanovsky and his pupils verified the accuracy of the technique and described the phases of the auscultatory sounds and for a time technique was known as the Korotkov-Yanovsky method.

Nikolai Korotkov, then serving as research physician to the mining district of Vitimsko-Olekminsky in Siberia, received his doctorate in 1910. After that he served as surgeon to the workers of the gold mines of Lensk. Here he witnessed Tsarist atrocities and was affected deeply by the murder of unarmed striking miners. After this Korotkov returned to St. Petersburg and during the First World War he was surgeon to "The Charitable House for disabled soldiers" in Tsarskoe Selo. He welcomed the October Revolution after which he was physician-in-chief of the Mechnikov Hospital in Petrograd until his death from lung tuberculosis on March 14, 1920.

== Associated eponyms ==
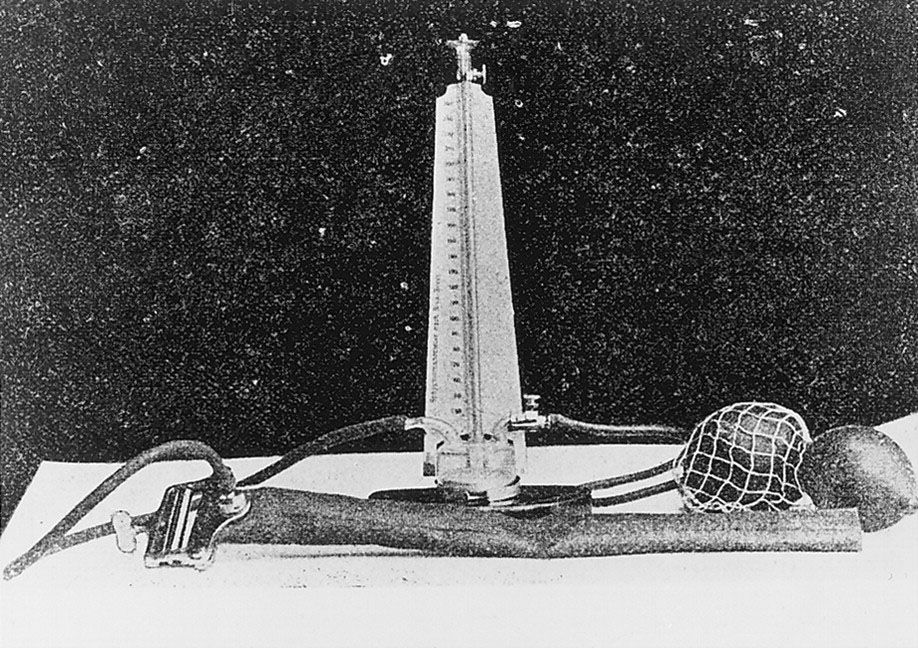
Mercury sphygmomanometer that belonged to Korotkoff.

- Korotkoff method is a non-invasive auscultatory technique for determining both systolic and diastolic blood pressure levels. The method requires а sphygmomanometer and а stethoscope. Due to ease and accuracy, it is considered a "gold standard" for blood pressure measurement
- Korotkoff sounds are pulse-synchronous circulatory sounds heard through the stethoscope in auscultation of blood pressure using Riva-Rocci's sphygmomanometer.
- Korotkoff test or Korotkoff sign is a collateral circulation test: in aneurysm, if the blood pressure in the peripheral circulation remains fairly high while the artery above the aneurysm is compressed, the collateral circulation is good.

== Bibliography ==
- To the question of methods of determining the blood pressure (from the clinic of Professor S. P. Fedorov) [Russian]. Reports of the Imperial Military Academy 1905, 11: 365-367.
- Contribution to the methods of measuring blood pressure; second preliminary report 13 December 1905 [Russian]. Vrach Gaz 1906, 10: 278.
- Experiments for determining the efficiency of arterial collaterals. Stremennaia, 12 St Peterburg. P P Soykine's Press, 1910. (and Segall HN. Experiments for determining the efficiency of arterial collaterals by N C Korotkoff. Montreal: Mansfield Book Mart, 1980:265. - Preface biographical notes and editing of translation from Russian.)

== Memory ==
- The city hospital is named after Nikolai Korotkov in Kursk;
- The N. S. Korotkov Medal for medical practitioners has been established in the region.
