= Ernst Pitner =

Ernst Pitner (1838–1896) was an Austrian Empire lieutenant who accompanied Archduke Maximilian to Mexico in 1864. Pitner kept a journal that described the exploits of the ill-conceived military campaign to make Maximilian emperor of Mexico. He was captured along with Maximilian and other officers, but unlike a number of his companions, he escaped execution and returned to Austria.

Pitner's journal was translated and edited by Gordon Etherington-Smith, and published as a book called Maximilian's Lieutenant: A Personal History of the Mexican Campaign 1864-67. In this book Pitner provides a firsthand account of life in Mexico from the viewpoint of an Austrian soldier, describing the local populace, the battles and his personal journeys in the country.
