= Arterial line =

Catheter inserted into an artery

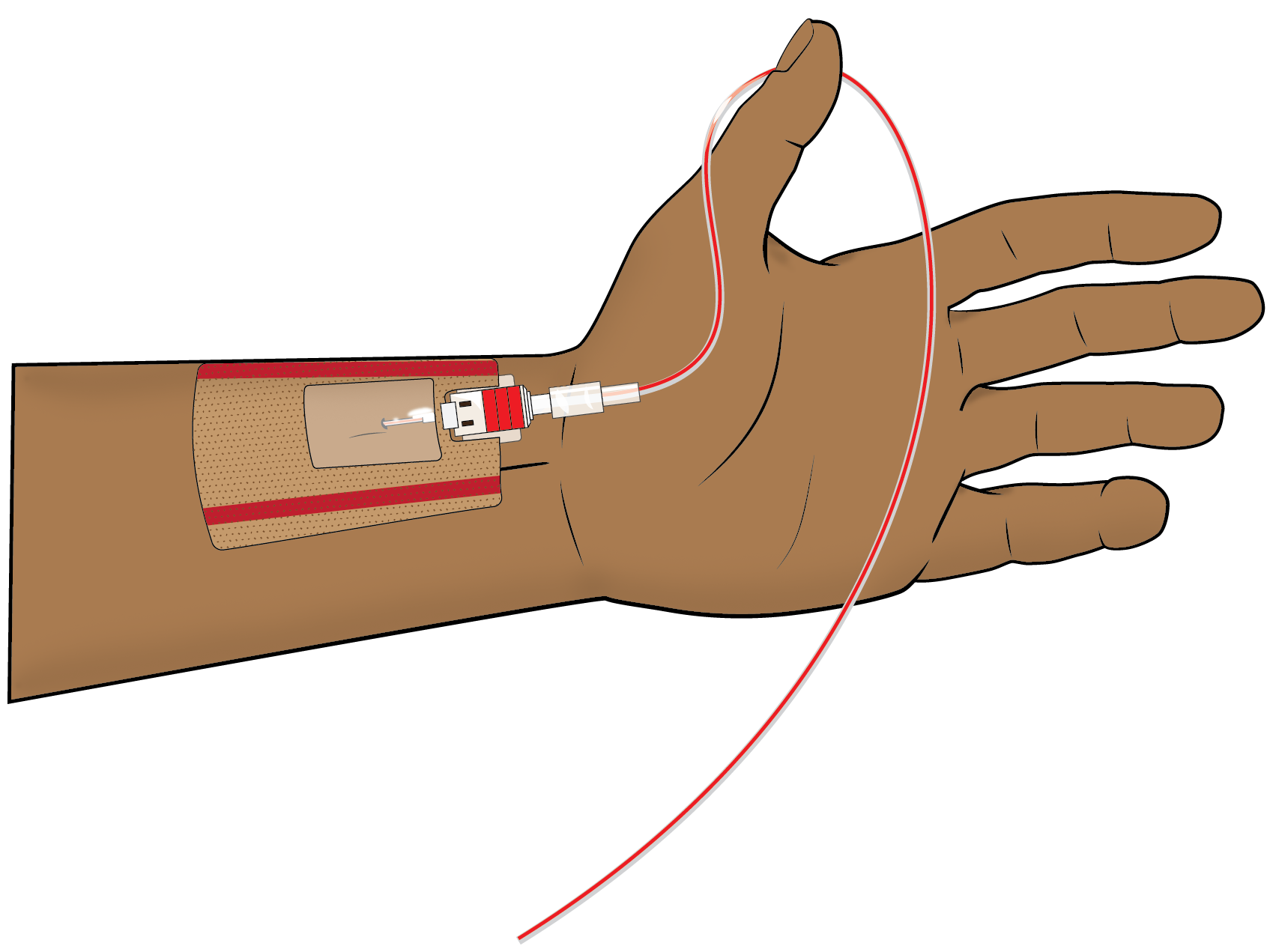
Illustration of an arterial catheter inserted in the left radial artery and covered with a dressing

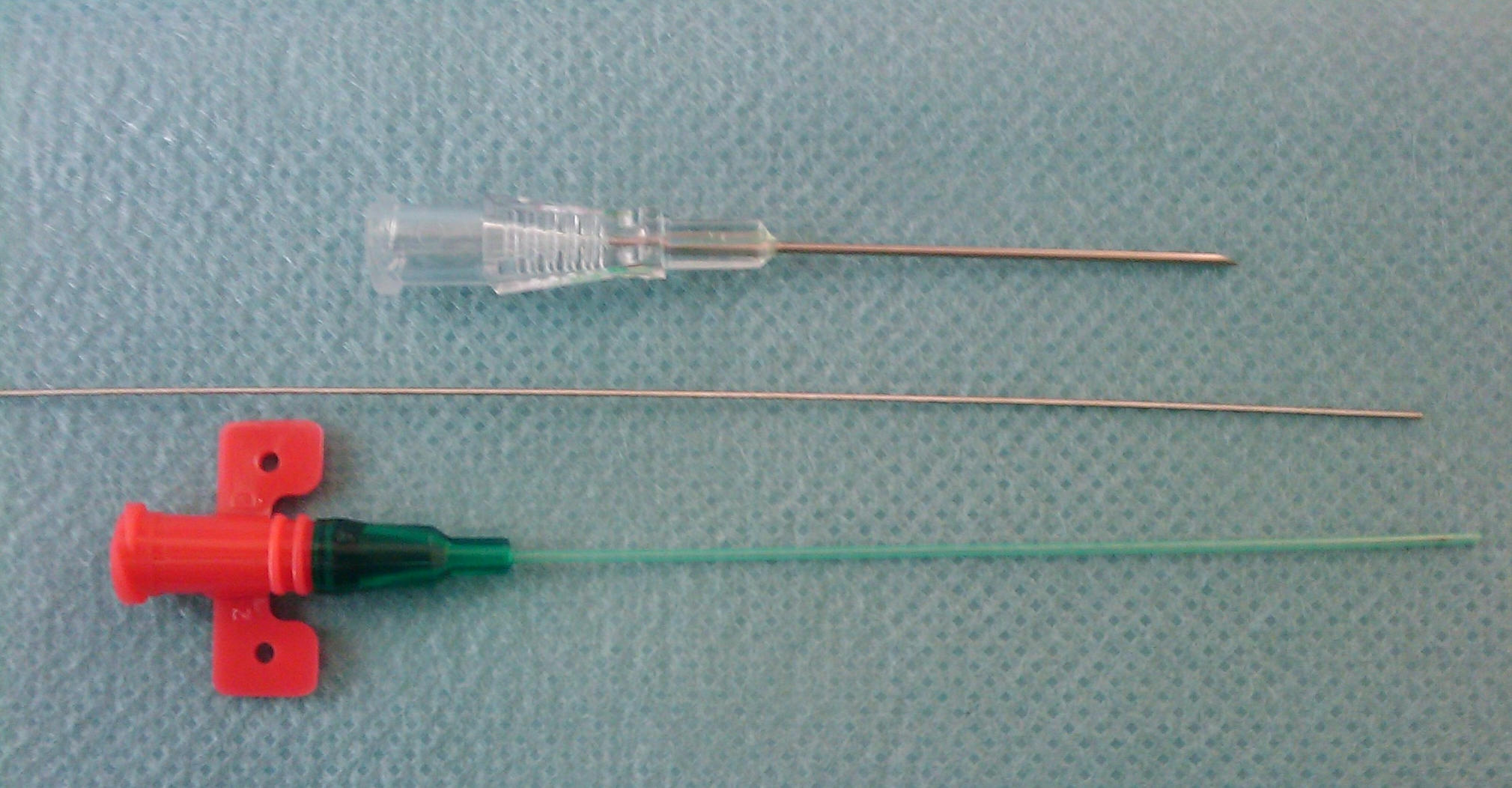
Arterial catheter (Seldinger technique)

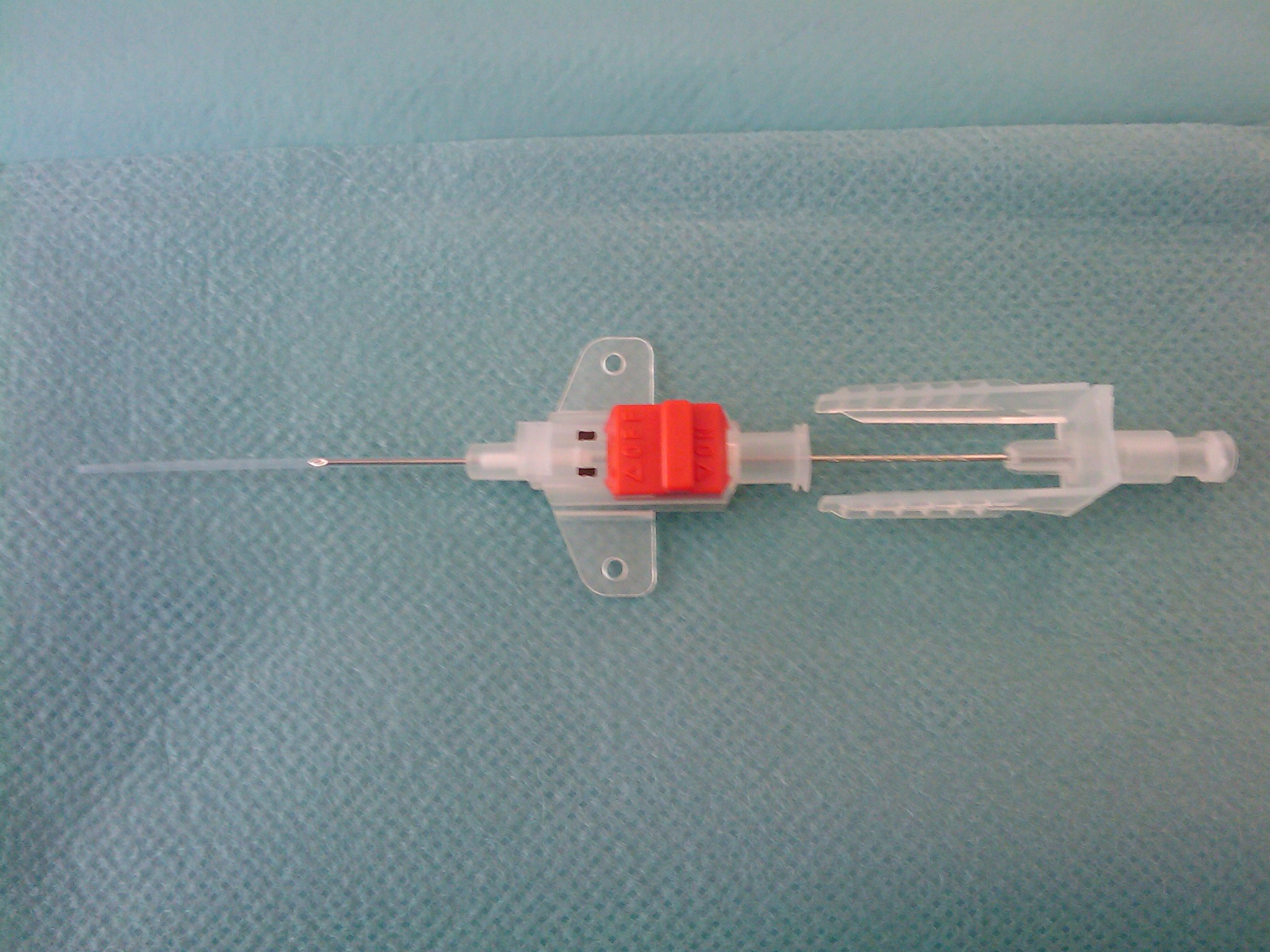
Arterial catheter (Punktion technique)

An arterial line (also art-line or a-line) is a thin catheter inserted into an artery.

== Use ==
Arterial lines are most commonly used in intensive care medicine and anesthesia to monitor blood pressure directly and in real-time (rather than by intermittent and indirect measurement) and to obtain samples for arterial blood gas analysis. Arterial lines are generally not used to administer medication, since many injectable drugs may lead to serious tissue damage and even require amputation of the limb if administered into an artery rather than a vein.

An arterial line is usually inserted into the radial artery in the wrist, but can also be inserted into the brachial artery at the elbow, into the femoral artery in the groin, into the dorsalis pedis artery in the foot, or into the ulnar artery in the wrist. A golden rule is that there has to be collateral circulation to the area affected by the chosen artery, so that peripheral circulation is maintained by another artery even if circulation is disturbed in the cannulated artery.

Insertion is often painful; an anesthetic such as lidocaine can be used to make the insertion more tolerable and to help prevent vasospasm, thereby making insertion of the arterial line somewhat easier. Often times, this is also done after induction of General anesthesia.
