= Scipione Riva-Rocci =

Italian physician (1863–1937)

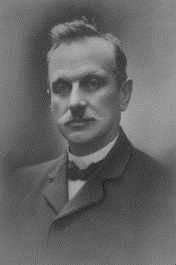
Scipione Riva-Rocci

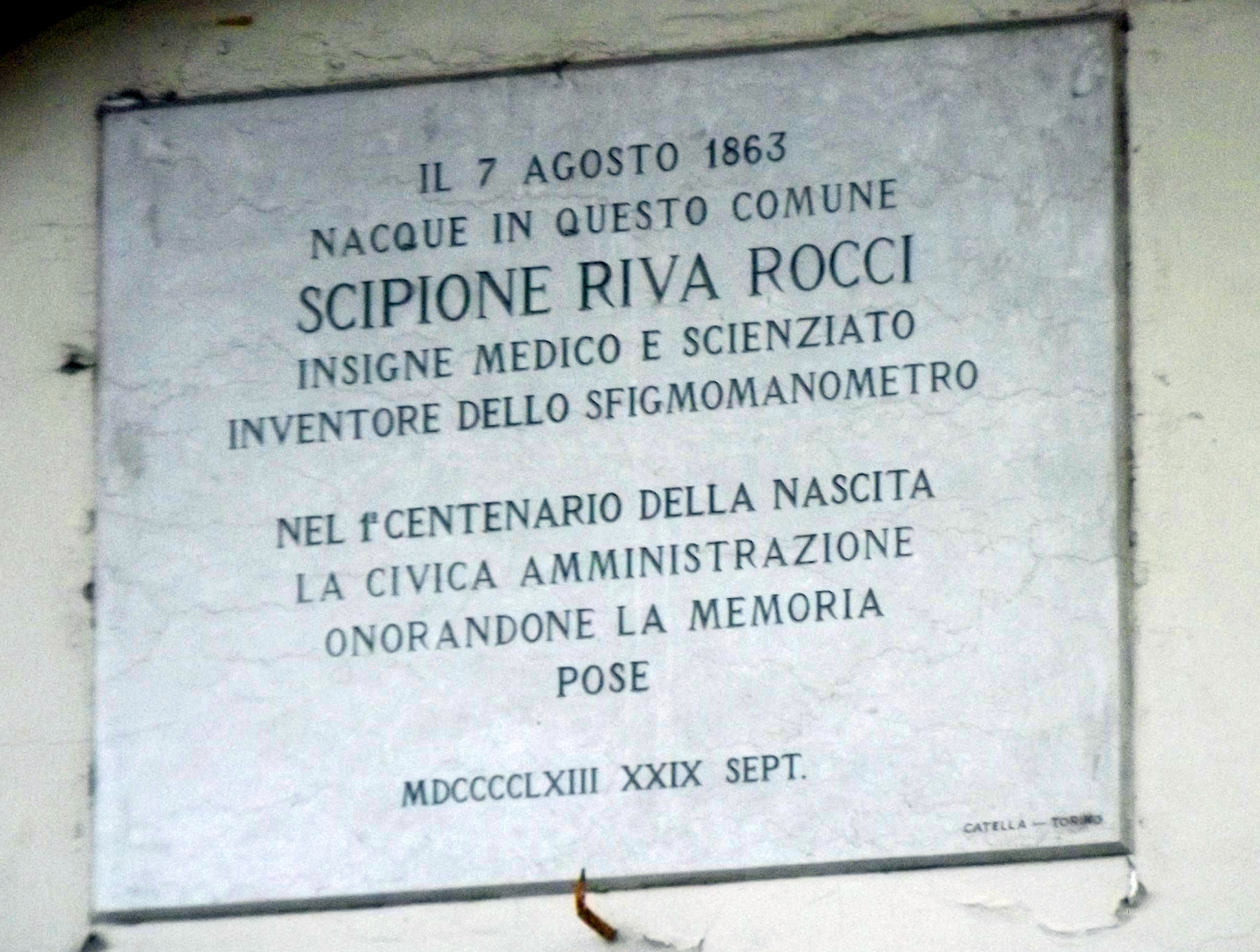
Place of birth Riva-Rocci

Scipione Riva Rocci (7 August 1863 in Almese, Piedmont – 15 March 1937 in Rapallo, Liguria) was an Italian internist, pathologist and pediatrician. He is best known for inventing an easy-to-use cuff-based version of the mercury sphygmomanometer to measure blood pressure.

== Biography ==
Riva Rocci was born on 7 August 1863 in Almese. He graduated in medicine and surgery in 1888 from the University of Turin. From 1888 to 1898 he acted as assistant lecturer at the propaedeutic medical clinic in Turin under the guidance of Carlo Forlanini and assisted him in the application of "iatrogenic pneumothorax" for treatment of pulmonary tuberculosis. In 1894 he graduated in pathology and in 1907 in pediatrics. In 1898, he followed Forlanini to the University of Pavia where he continued to contribute to the development of Forlanini's method by showing that the technique did not have a major adverse effect on lung function. From 1900 until 1928 was chief clinician and director of the civic hospital in Varese, and helped to modernize the hospital by opening sanatorium wings and introducing vaccination, radiology and other methods to fight tuberculosis. From 1909 to 1916, he occupied the first chair of pediatrics at Pavia University.

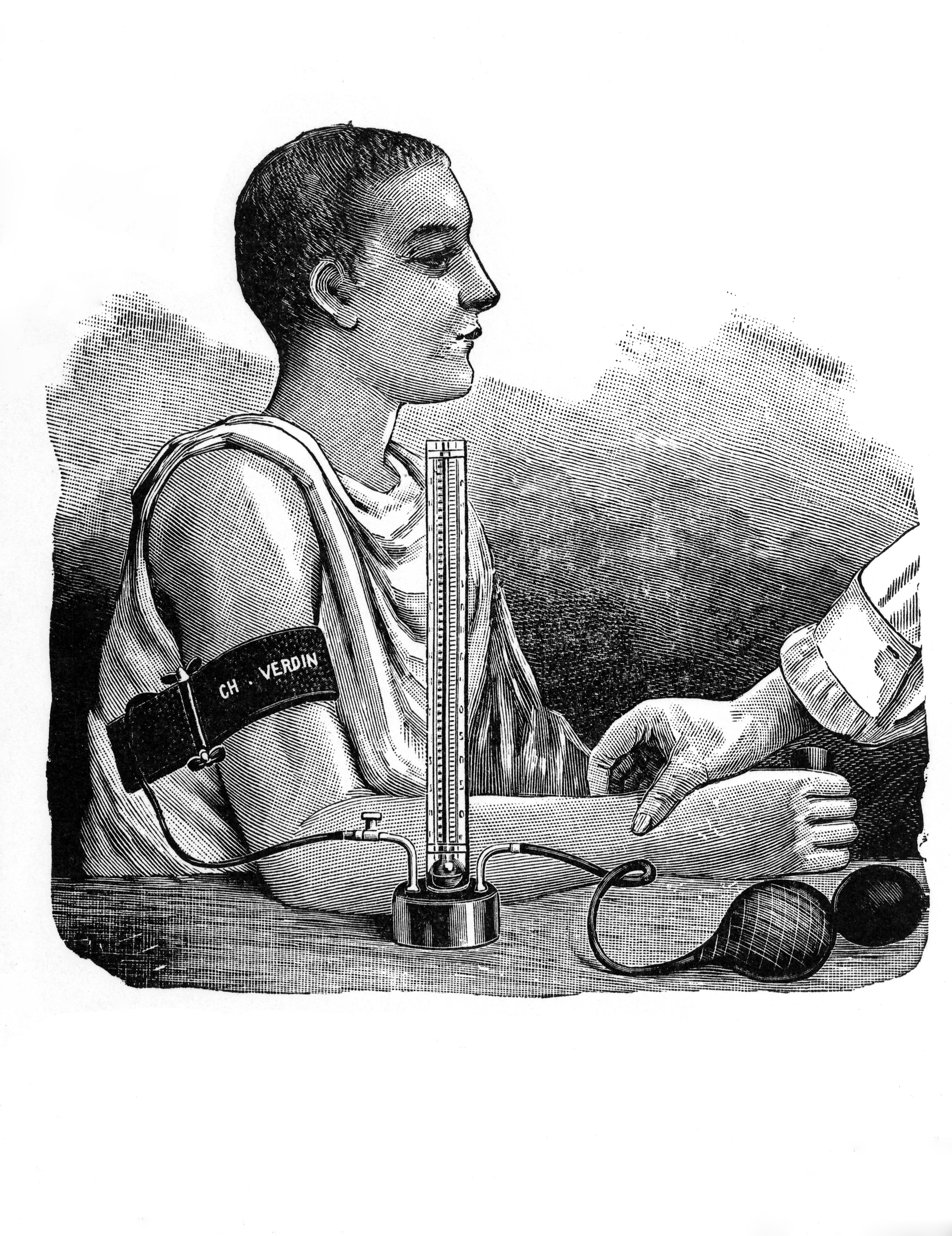
Illustration of Riva-Rocci's spygmomanometer in use

In 1928 he retired from his medical positions due to a neurological condition, probably encephalitis lethargica, which he may have contracted from a patient or an autopsy during an epidemic in 1921. He spent the last years of his life in ill-health with paralysis agitans, and died on 15 March 1937 in Rapallo. He was buried in the small cemetery of San Michele di Pagana.

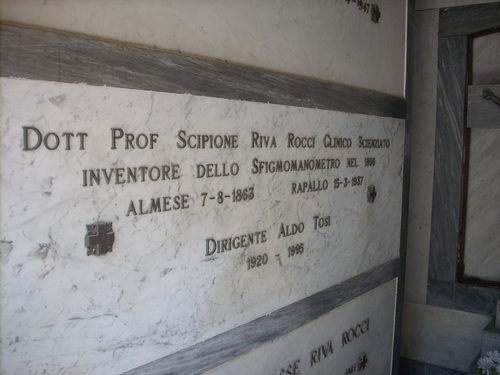
The tomb of Riva-Rocci

== Invention of a sphygmomanometer ==
Riva Rocci's major contribution to medicine was inventing an easy-to-use version of the mercury sphygmomanometer that measured brachial blood pressure. The key element of this design was the use of a cuff that encircled the arm; previous designs had used rubber bulbs filled with water or air to manually compress the artery or other technically difficult methods to measure pressure.

In 1896, Riva Rocci published his work describing the new sphygmomanometer in the Gazzetta Medica di Torino. In total he published four papers on the design and usage of the device between 1896 and 1897. His design included every-day objects such as an inkwell, some copper pipe, bicycle inner tubing and a quantity of mercury. Riva Rocci measured the peak (systolic) blood pressure by observing the cuff pressure at which the radial pulse was no longer palpable. This approach did not allow measurement of diastolic blood pressure, although it could estimate mean arterial pressure with the device, albeit with some difficulty.

The American neurosurgeon Harvey Cushing (1869–1939) visited Riva Rocci at Pavia in 1901 and made drawings and was given an example of his device. On his return to the US, he made a similar device with some improvements and used it successfully in Johns Hopkins Hospital, most notably in intracranial surgery. Cushing, with support from Theodore Janeway in New York City and George Crile in Cleveland, played a major role in popularizing Riva Rocci's mercury sphygmomanometer. Subsequent improvements to the device included the use of a wider cuff (the original was only 5 cm wide) and the use of Korotkoff sounds to determine systolic and diastolic blood pressure. Riva Rocci always refused to patent his invention and did not make any financial gains from its widespread use.

== Memorials ==
- Almese, his native town, has dedicated the local middle school to him.
- Riva Rocci's initials RR are used to indicate blood pressure measured with his technique.
