= Sphygmomanometer =

Instrument for measuring blood pressure

A sphygmomanometer (/ˌsfɪɡmoʊməˈnɒmɪtər/ SFIG-moh-mə-NO-mi-tər), also known as a blood pressure monitor, blood pressure machine, or blood pressure gauge, is a device used to measure blood pressure, composed of an inflatable cuff to collapse and then release the artery under the cuff in a controlled manner, and a mercury or aneroid manometer to measure the pressure. Manual sphygmomanometers are used with a stethoscope when using the auscultatory technique.

A sphygmomanometer consists of an inflatable cuff, a measuring unit (the mercury manometer, or aneroid gauge), and a mechanism for inflation which may be a manually operated bulb and valve or a pump operated electrically.

== Etymology ==
The word sphygmomanometer uses the combining form of sphygmo- + manometer. The roots involved are as follows: Greek σφυγμός sphygmos "pulse", plus the scientific term manometer (from French manomètre), i.e., "pressure meter", itself coined from μανός manos "thin, sparse", and μέτρον metron "measure".

Most sphygmomanometers were mechanical gauges with dial faces, or mercury columns, during most of the 20th century. Since the advent of electronic medical devices, names such as "meter" and "monitor" can also apply, as devices can automatically monitor blood pressure on an ongoing basis.

== History ==
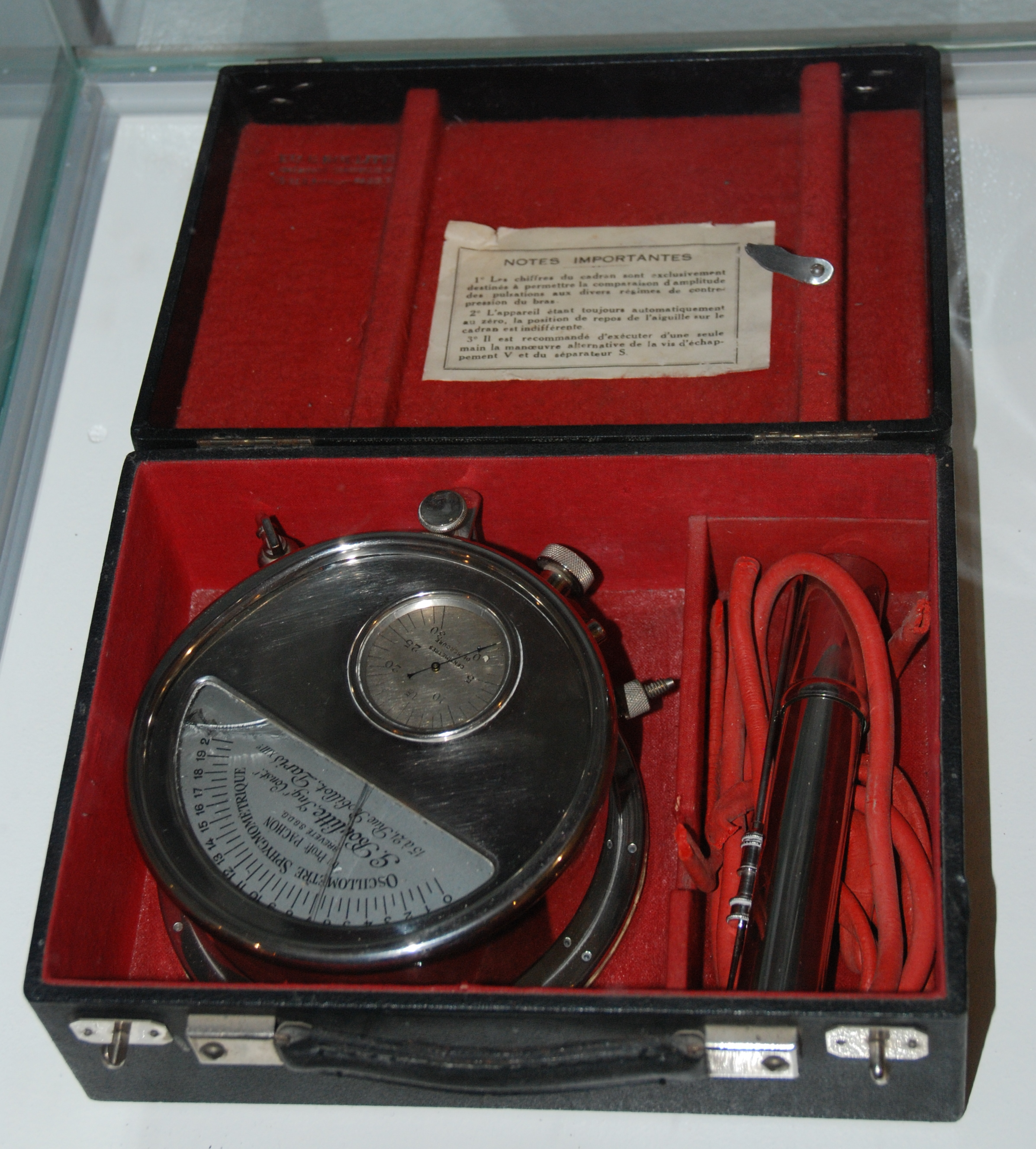
A French sphygmomanometer used during World War I

The sphygmomanometer developed from an earlier instrument the Sphygmograph (/ˈsfɪɡməˌɡræf, ˌɡrɑːf/[1][2] SFIG-mə-graf) a mechanical device used to measure blood pressure, that was developed in the mid-19th century by German physiologist Karl von Vierordt (1818–1884).

The device was a system of levers hooked to a scale-pan in which weights were placed to determine the amount of external pressure needed to stop blood flow in the radial artery. Although the instrument was cumbersome and its measurements imprecise, the basic concept of Vierordt's sphygmograph eventually led to the blood pressure cuff used today.

In 1863, Étienne-Jules Marey (1830–1904) improved the device by making it portable. Also he included a specialized instrument to be placed above the radial artery that was able to magnify pulse waves and record them on paper with an attached pen.

In 1872, Frederick Akbar Mahomed published a description of a modified sphygmograph. This modified version made the sphygmograph quantitative, so that it was able to measure arterial blood pressure. In 1881 Samuel Siegfried Karl Ritter von Basch devised the sphygmomanometer.

Scipione Riva-Rocci introduced a more easily-usable version in 1896. In 1901, pioneering neurosurgeon Dr. Harvey Cushing brought an example of Riva-Rocci's device to the US, modernized and popularized it within the medical community. Further improvement came in 1905 when Russian physician Nikolai Korotkov included diastolic blood pressure measurement following his discovery of "Korotkoff sounds". William A. Baum invented the Baumanometer brand in 1916, while working for The Life Extension Institute which performed insurance and employment physicals.

== Types ==
Both manual and digital meters are currently employed, with different trade-offs in accuracy versus convenience.

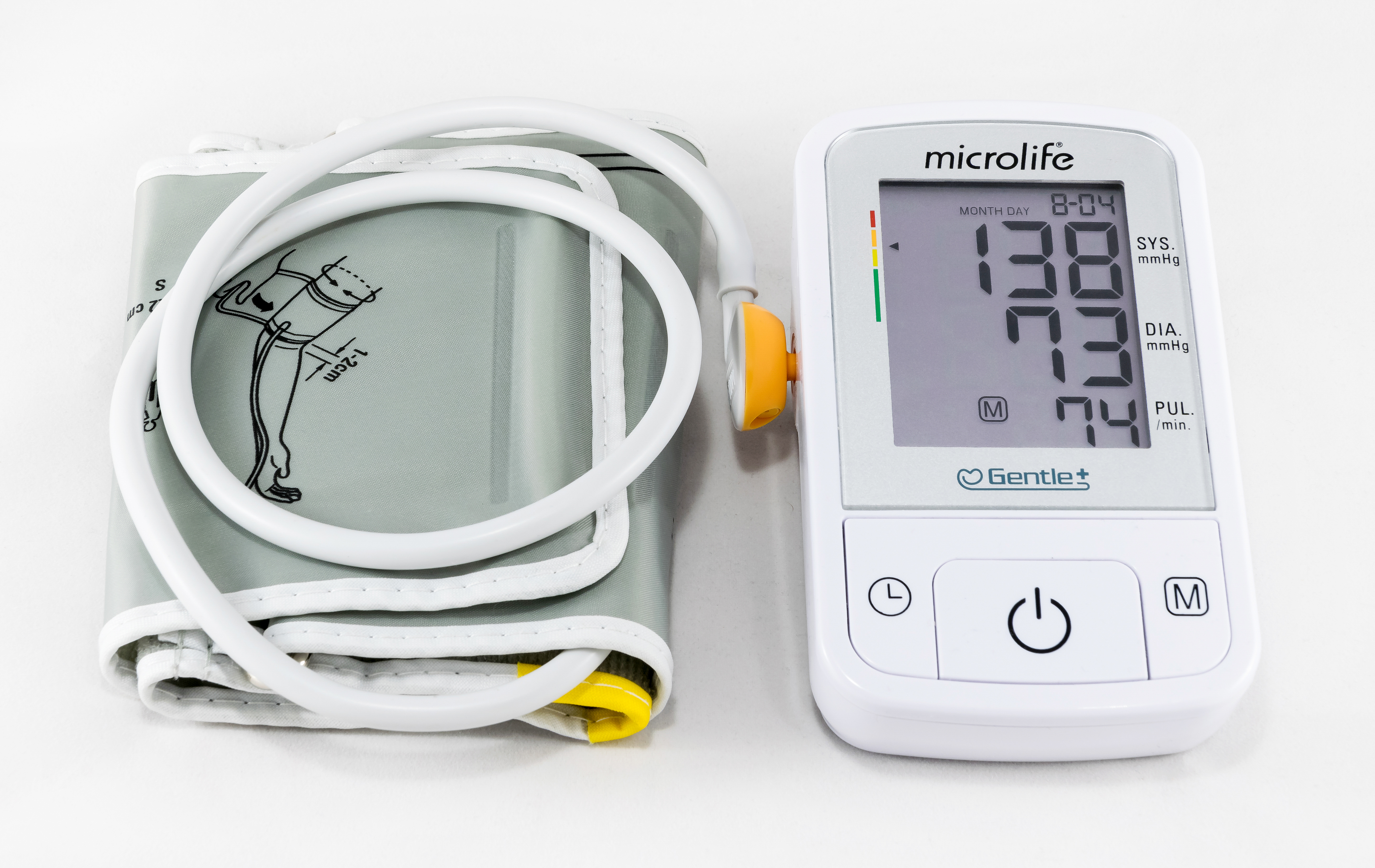
BP 138/73 mmHg as result on electronic sphygmomanometer

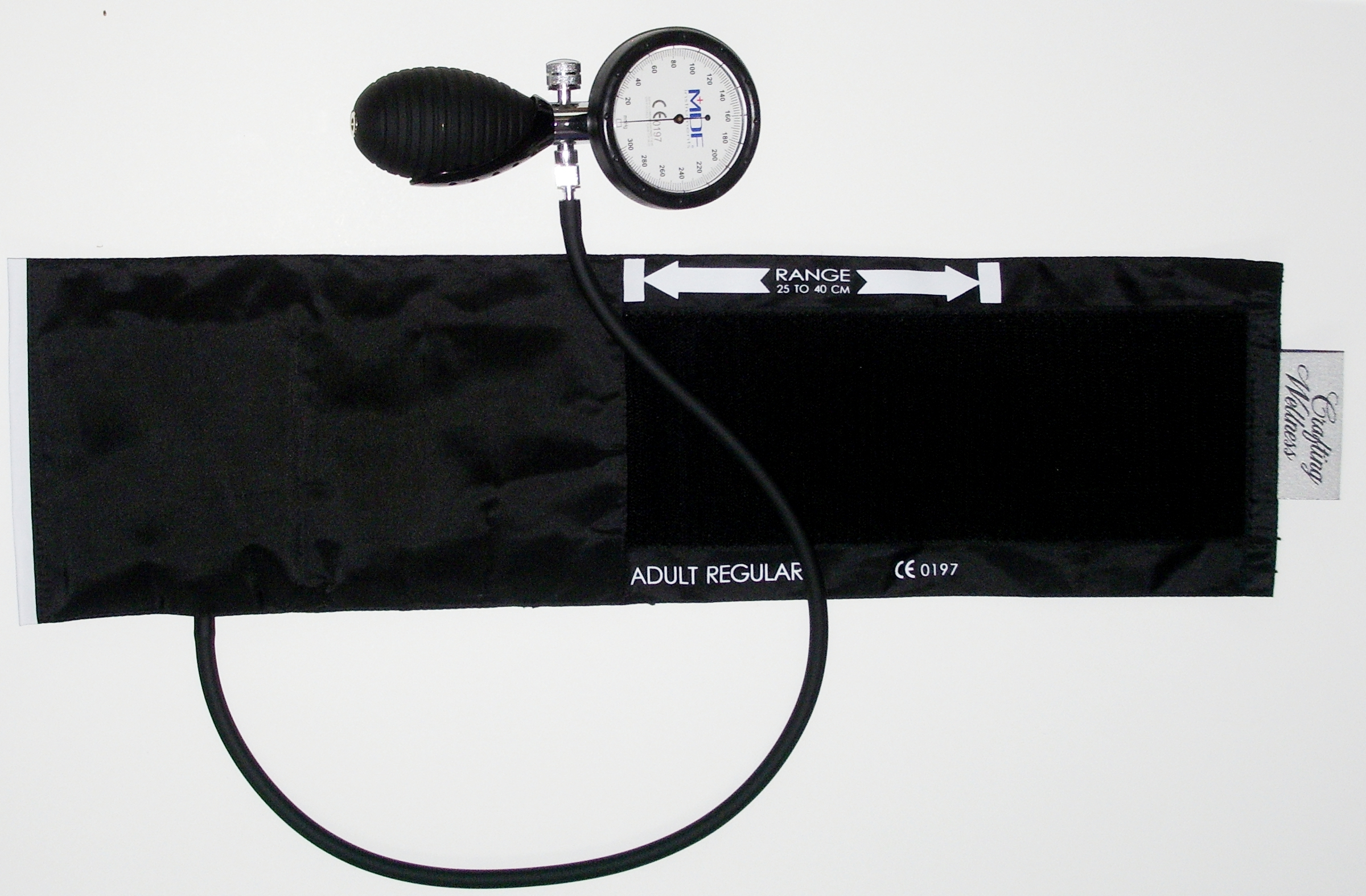
Aneroid sphygmomanometer with an adult cuff

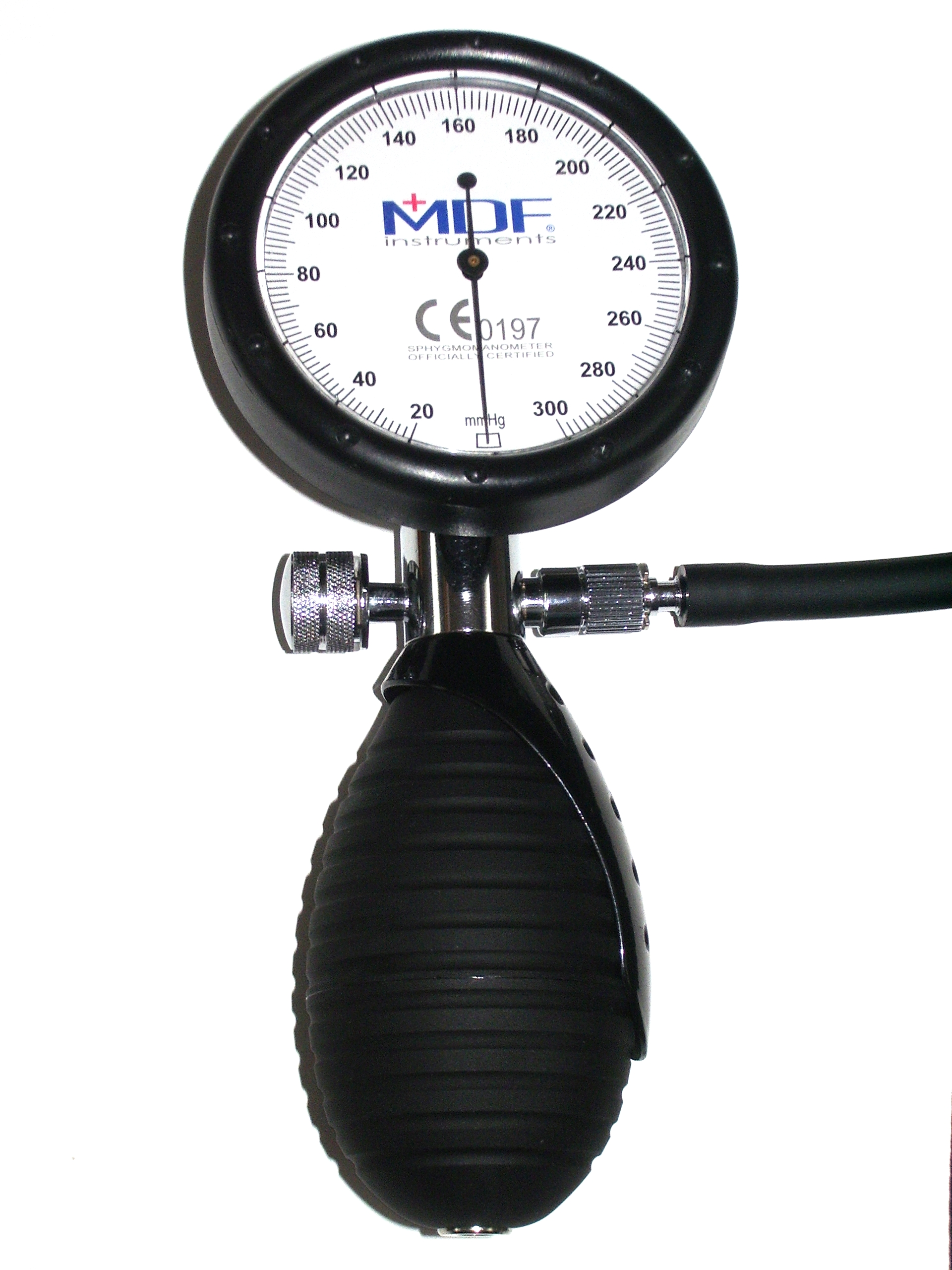
Aneroid sphygmomanometer dial, bulb, and air valve

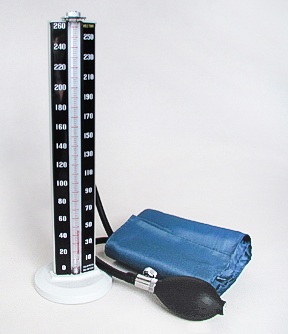
Clinical mercury manometer

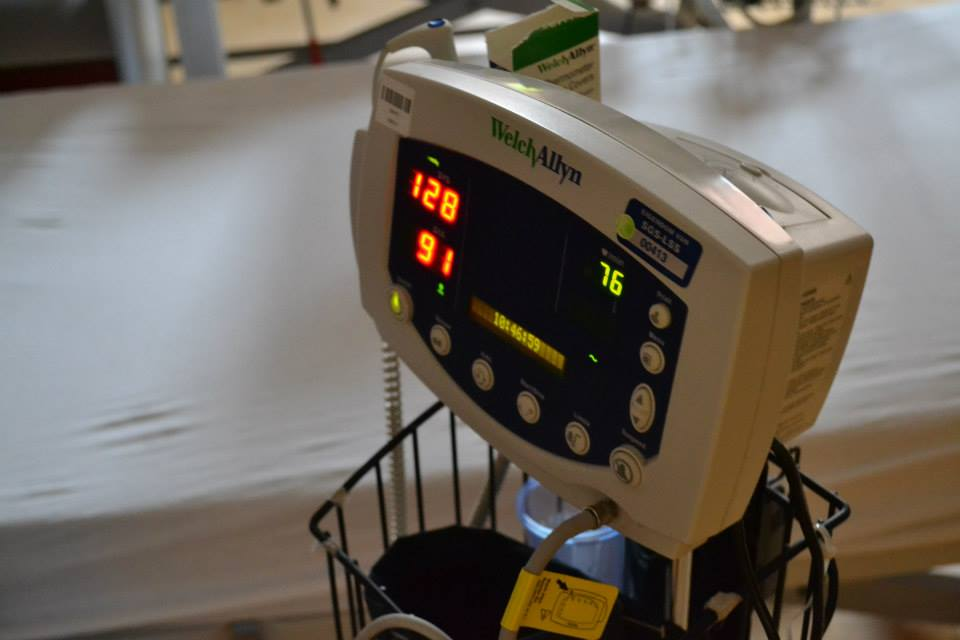
Clinical WelchAllyn sphygmomanometer

=== Manual ===
A stethoscope is required for auscultation (see below). Manual meters are best used by trained practitioners, and, while it is possible to obtain a basic reading through palpation alone, this yields only the systolic pressure.

- Mercury sphygmomanometers are considered the gold standard. They indicate pressure with a column of mercury, which does not require recalibration. Because of their accuracy, they are often used in clinical trials of drugs and in clinical evaluations of high-risk patients, including pregnant women. A frequently used wall mounted mercury sphygmomanometer is also known as a Baumanometer.
- Aneroid sphygmomanometers (mechanical types with a dial) are in common use; they may require calibration checks, unlike mercury manometers. Aneroid sphygmomanometers are considered safer than mercury sphygmomanometers, although inexpensive ones are less accurate. A major cause of departure from calibration is mechanical jarring. Aneroids mounted on walls or stands are not susceptible to this particular problem.

=== Digital ===
Digital meters employ oscillometric measurements and electronic calculations rather than auscultation. They may use manual or automatic inflation, but both types are electronic, easy to operate without training, and can be used in noisy environments. They calculate systolic and diastolic pressures by oscillometric detection, employing either deformable membranes that are measured using differential capacitance, or differential piezoresistance, and they include a microprocessor. They estimate mean arterial blood pressure and measure pulse rate; while systolic and diastolic pressures are obtained less accurately than with manual meters, and calibration is also a concern. Digital oscillometric monitors may not be advisable for some patients, such as those with arteriosclerosis, arrhythmia, preeclampsia, pulsus alternans, and pulsus paradoxus, as their calculations may not be correct for these conditions, and in these cases, an analog sphygmomanometer is preferable when used by a trained person.

Digital instruments may use a cuff placed, in order of accuracy and inverse order of portability and convenience, around the upper arm, the wrist, or a finger. Recently, a group of researchers at Michigan State University developed a smartphone based device that uses oscillometry to estimate blood pressure. The oscillometric method of detection used gives blood pressure readings that differ from those determined by auscultation, and vary according to many factors, such as pulse pressure, heart rate and arterial stiffness, although some instruments are claimed also to measure arterial stiffness, and some can detect irregular heartbeats.

== Operation ==
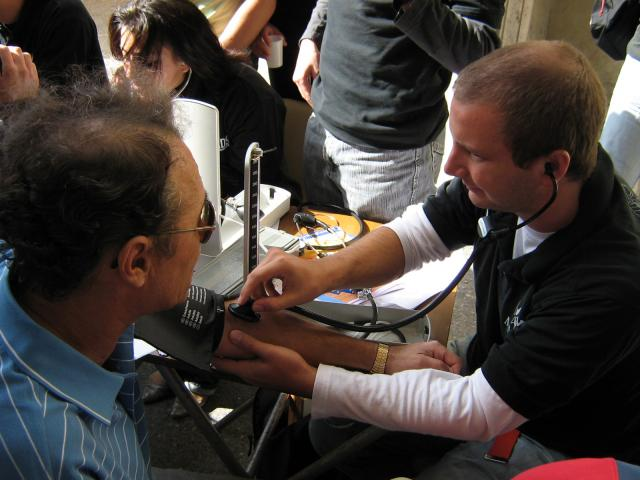
Medical student taking blood pressure at the brachial artery

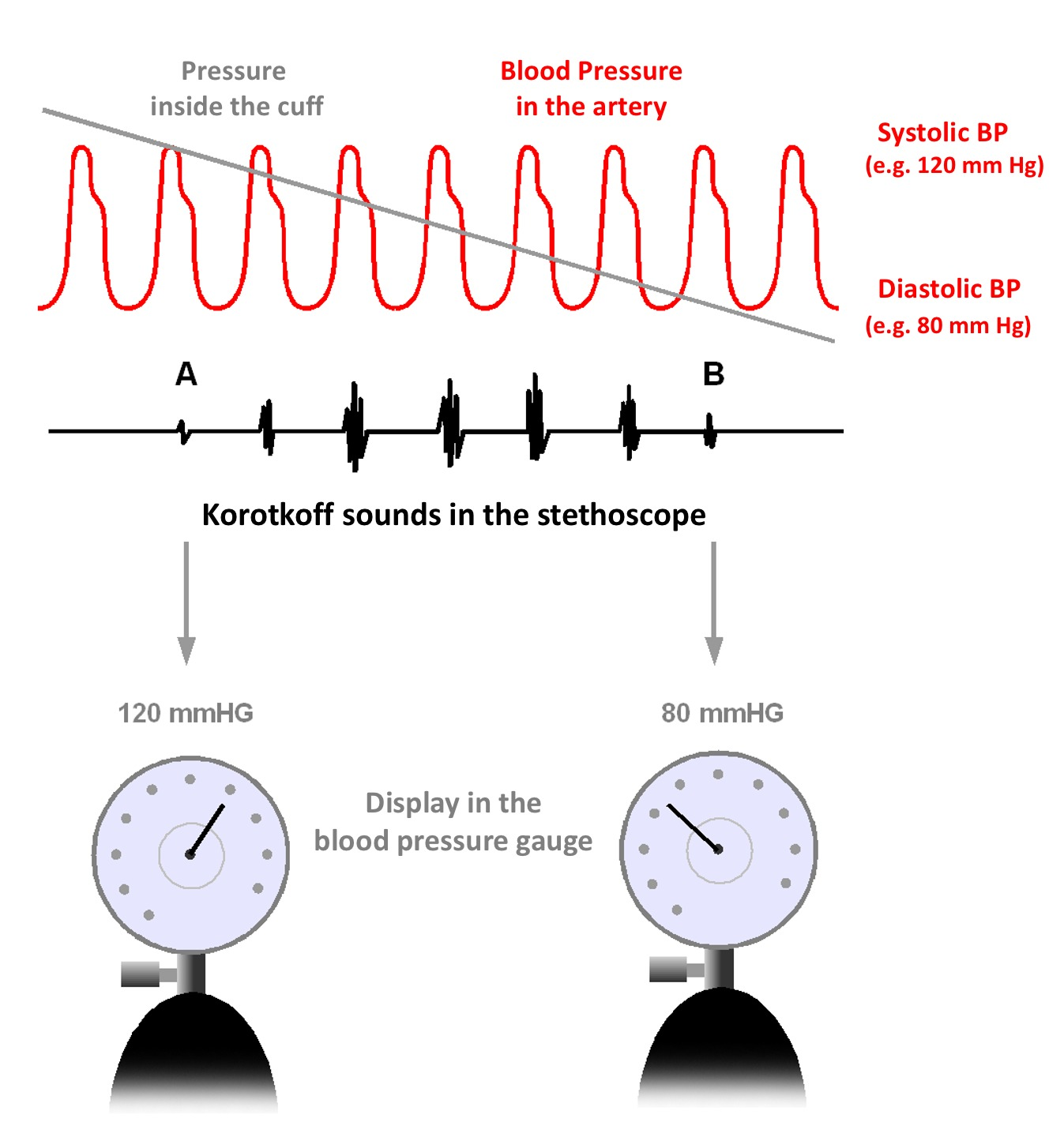
Explanation of how blood pressure is measured based on Korotkow sounds

In humans, the cuff is normally placed smoothly and snugly around an upper arm, at roughly the same vertical height as the heart while the subject is seated with the arm supported. Other sites of placement depend on species and may include the flipper or tail. It is essential that the correct size of cuff is selected for the patient. Too small a cuff results in too high a pressure, while too large a cuff results in too low a pressure. For clinical measurements it is usual to measure and record both arms in the initial consultation to determine if the pressure is significantly higher in one arm than the other. A difference of 10 mmHg may be a sign of coarctation of the aorta. If the arms read differently, the higher reading arm would be used for later readings. The cuff is inflated until the artery is completely occluded.

With a manual instrument, listening with a stethoscope to the brachial artery, the examiner slowly releases the pressure in the cuff at a rate of approximately 2 mmHg per heart beat. As the pressure in the cuffs falls, a "whooshing" or pounding sound is heard (see Korotkoff sounds) when blood flow first starts again in the artery. The pressure at which this sound began is noted and recorded as the systolic blood pressure. The cuff pressure is further released until the sound can no longer be heard. This is recorded as the diastolic blood pressure. In noisy environments where auscultation is impossible (such as the scenes often encountered in emergency medicine), systolic blood pressure alone may be read by releasing the pressure until a radial pulse is palpated (felt). In veterinary medicine, auscultation is rarely of use, and palpation or visualization of pulse distal to the sphygmomanometer is used to detect systolic pressure.

Digital instruments use a cuff which may be placed, according to the instrument, around the upper arm, wrist, or a finger, in all cases elevated to the same height as the heart. They inflate the cuff and gradually reduce the pressure in the same way as a manual meter, and measure blood pressures by the oscillometric method.

Guidelines from the American Heart Association and the European Society of Cardiology, among other institutions, recommend a resting period of at least 5 minutes before measuring blood pressure. However, a 2017 study for the Scientific Reports journal found that only half of the general population reach a stabilised blood pressure after 5 minutes, and instead recommended at least 25 minutes at rest before measuring blood pressure.

== Significance ==
By observing the mercury in the column, or the aneroid gauge pointer, while releasing the air pressure with a control valve, the operator notes the values of the blood pressure in mmHg. The peak pressure in the arteries during the cardiac cycle is the systolic pressure, and the lowest pressure (at the resting phase of the cardiac cycle) is the diastolic pressure. A stethoscope, applied lightly over the artery being measured, is used in the auscultatory method. Systolic pressure (first phase) is identified with the first of the continuous Korotkoff sounds. Diastolic pressure is identified at the moment the Korotkoff sounds disappear (fifth phase).

Measurement of the blood pressure is carried out in the diagnosis and treatment of hypertension (high blood pressure) and in many other healthcare scenarios.

== See also ==
- Critical closing pressure
