= Benign hypertension =

Human disease

Benign hypertension or benign essential hypertension are medical terms now considered obsolete, but once used to describe mild to moderate hypertension (high blood pressure).

These historical terms are considered misleading, as hypertension is never benign. Coonsequently, the terms have fallen out of use (see history of hypertension). The terminology persisted in the International Classification of Disease (ICD9), but is not included in the ICD10 as of 2014.
