= Systolic =

Systolic is an adjective describing something pertaining to a systole, part of the cardiac cycle.

Systolic may also refer to:

== Physiology and medical ==
- Systolic hypertension
- Systolic heart murmur

== Mathematics ==
- Systolic geometry

== Technology ==
- Systolic array
