= World Hypertension Day =

Health awareness day

World Hypertension Day (WHD) is a day designated and initiated by The World Hypertension League (WHL), which is itself an umbrella to organizations of 85 national hypertension societies and leagues. The day was initiated to increase the awareness of hypertension. This was especially important because of the lack of appropriate knowledge among hypertensive patients. The WHL launched its first WHD on May 14, 2005. Since 2006, the WHL has been dedicating May 17 of every year as WHD.

In 2005, as the inaugural effort, the theme was simply "Awareness of high blood pressure". The 2006 theme was "Treat to goal", with a focus on keeping blood pressure under control. The recommended blood pressures are less than 140/90 mmHg for the general population and for the hypertensive population without any other complications, and less than 130/80 mmHg for those with diabetes mellitus or chronic kidney disease. These are the cut-off values recommended by international and Canadian guidelines. The 2007 WHD theme was "Healthy diet, healthy blood pressure". Through such specific themes, the WHL intends to raise awareness not only of hypertension, but also of factors contributing to an increase in the incidence of hypertension and on ways to prevent it. In an effort to empower the public, the theme for 2008 was "Measure your blood pressure…at home". Recent reports confirm the ease, accuracy and safety of blood pressure measurements using home monitors.

For the five-year period 2013-2018, the theme of WHD was "Know Your Numbers" with the goal of increasing high blood pressure awareness in all populations around the world.

== World Hypertension Day 2025 ==
This year marked two decades of global efforts to raise awareness about high blood pressure. The theme for 2025, "Measure Your Blood Pressure Accurately, Control It, Live Longer", aimed to emphasize the value of precise monitoring and proactive management of hypertension to prevent serious health risks such as heart attacks, strokes, and kidney issues.
