= White coat hypertension =

- Other names: White coat syndrome
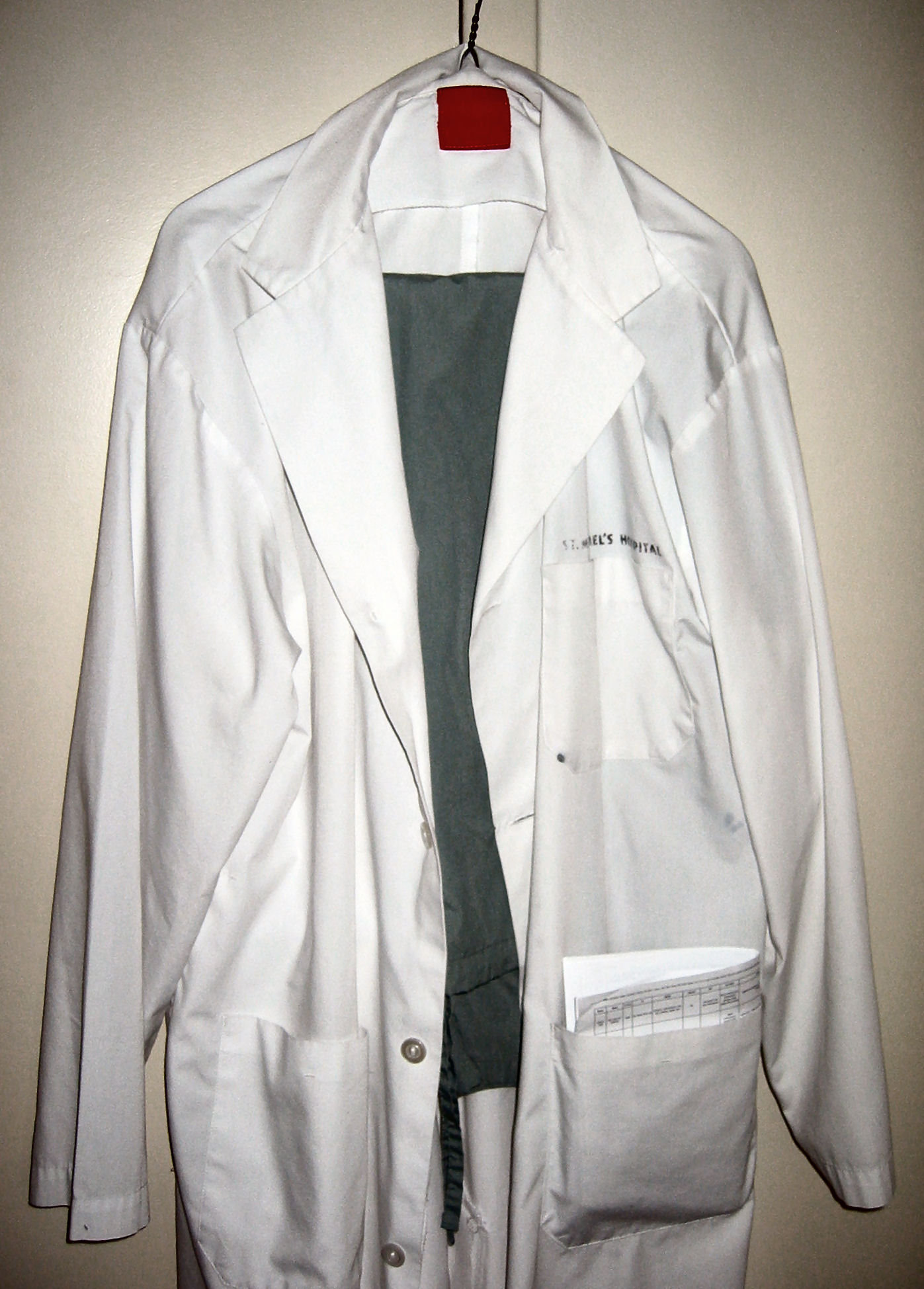
- A white coat and scrubs

White coat hypertension (WHT), also known as white coat syndrome, is a form of labile hypertension in which people exhibit a blood pressure level above the normal range in a clinical setting, although they do not exhibit it in other settings. It is believed that the phenomenon is due to anxiety experienced during a clinic visit. The patient's daytime ambulatory blood pressure is used as a reference as it takes into account ordinary levels of daily stress.

Masked hypertension (MH) is the contrasting phenomenon, whereby a patient's blood pressure is above the normal range during daily living but not in a clinic setting.

== Diagnosis ==
In studies, white coat hypertension can be defined as the presence of a defined hypertensive average blood pressure in a clinic setting, although it isn't present when the patient is at home.

Diagnosis is made difficult as a result of the unreliable measures taken from the conventional methods of detection. These methods often involve an interface with health care professionals and frequently results are tarnished by a list of factors including variability in the individual's blood pressure, technical inaccuracies, anxiety of the patient, inadequate cuff size of the instrument (sphygmomanometer) used to measure blood pressure, recent ingestion of pressor substances, and talking, amongst many other factors. Automated blood pressure measurements over 15 to 20 minutes in a quiet part of the office or clinic can reduce (but not eliminate) incorrect blood pressure measures.

People with white coat hypertension do not exhibit the signs indicative of trepidation and their increased blood pressure is often not accompanied by tachycardia. This is supported by studies that repeatedly indicate that 15%–30% of those thought to have mild hypertension as a result of clinic or office recordings display normal blood pressure and no unusual response to pressure stimulus. These persons did not show any specific characteristics such as age that may be indicative of a higher susceptibility to white coat hypertension.

Ambulatory blood pressure monitoring and patient self-measurement using a home blood pressure monitoring device is being increasingly used to differentiate those with white coat hypertension or experiencing the white coat effect from those with chronic hypertension. This does not mean that these methods are without fault. Daytime ambulatory values, despite taking into account stresses of everyday life when taken during the patient's daily routine, are still susceptible to the effects of daily variables such as physical activity, stress and duration of sleep. Ambulatory monitoring has been found to be the more practical and reliable method in detecting patients with white coat hypertension and for the prediction of target organ damage. Even as such, the diagnosis and treatment of white coat hypertension remains controversial.

A 2006 study of 98 patients showed that home blood pressure monitoring is as accurate as a 24-hour ambulatory monitoring in determining blood pressure levels.

Use of breathing patterns has been proposed as a technique for identifying white coat hypertension.

In one Turkish study of 438 consecutive patients, 38% were normotensive, 43% had white coat hypertension, 2% had masked hypertension, and 15% had sustained hypertension. Even patients taking medication for sustained hypertension who are normotensive at home may exhibit white coat hypertension in the office setting.

== Implications for treatment ==
When blood pressure is measured only in a clinic setting, an incorrect diagnosis of hypertension may be made whereas the person actually has white coat hypertension. In general, individuals with white coat hypertension have lower morbidity than patients with sustained hypertension, but higher morbidity than the clinically normotensive.
