= Salt and cardiovascular disease =

Association between salt consumption and cardiovascular disease

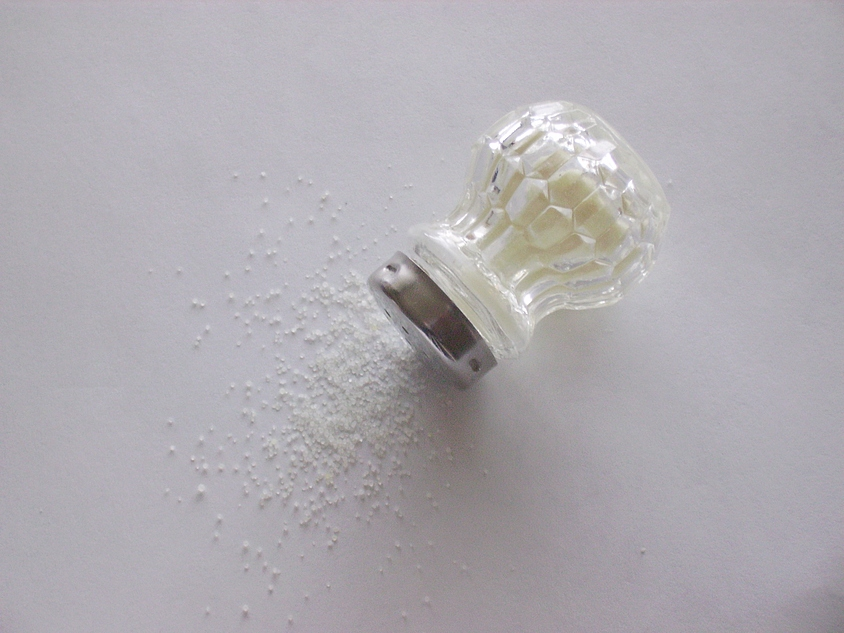
Table salt

Excess dietary salt (sodium chloride) consumption has been extensively studied for its potential impact on human health. Chronic, high intake of dietary salt is associated with hypertension and cardiovascular disease, among other adverse health outcomes. Major health and scientific organizations, such as the World Health Organization, the US Centers for Disease Control and Prevention, and the American Heart Association, have established high salt consumption as a major risk factor for cardiovascular diseases and stroke.

== Effect of salt on blood pressure ==
Salt fulfills several important biological functions in humans. The human body has evolved to compensate for high salt intake through regulatory systems such as the renin–angiotensin system. Salt is particularly involved with maintaining body fluid volume, including the regulation of osmotic balance in the blood, extracellular and intracellular fluids, and resting membrane potential.

When salt is ingested, it is dissolved in the blood as two separate ions – Na^{+} and Cl^{−}. While the kidney reacts to excrete excess sodium and chloride in the body, water retention causes blood pressure to increase.

=== Reducing salt intake in chronic kidney disease ===
A 2021 Cochrane review of people with chronic kidney disease, including those on dialysis, demonstrated robust evidence that salt reduction decreases systolic and diastolic blood pressure and albuminuria. However, there was moderate certainty evidence that some people may experience hypotensive symptoms, such as dizziness, following sudden reduction of salt intake. The effect of salt restriction on extracellular fluid, edema, and total body weight was uncertain.

=== Dietary Approaches to Stop Hypertension-Sodium study ===
The DASH-Sodium study was a sequel to the original DASH (Dietary Approaches to Stop Hypertension) study. Both studies were designed and conducted by the National Heart, Lung, and Blood Institute in the United States, each involving a large, randomized sample. While the original study was designed to test the effects of several varying nutrients on blood pressure, DASH-Sodium varies only in salt content in the diet.

Participants were pre-hypertensive or at stage 1 hypertension and either ate a DASH Diet or a diet reflecting an "average American Diet". During the intervention phase, participants ate their assigned diets containing three distinct levels of sodium in random order. Their blood pressure was monitored during the control period and at all three intervention phases.

The study concluded that the effect of a reduced dietary sodium intake alone on blood pressure is substantial and that the largest decrease in blood pressure occurred in those eating the DASH Diet at the lowest sodium level (1,500 milligrams per day). However, this study is especially significant because participants in both the control and DASH diet groups showed lowered blood pressure with decreased sodium alone.

In agreement with studies regarding salt sensitivity, participants of African descent showed high reductions in blood pressure.

== Hypertension and cardiovascular disease ==
In 2018, the American Heart Association published an advisory stating that "if people in the U.S. consume an average 1,500 mg/day sodium, it could result in a 25.6% decrease in high blood pressure and an estimated $26.2 billion in health care savings. Another estimate projects that achieving this goal would reduce cardiovascular disease deaths from 500,000 to nearly 1.2 million over the next 10 years." There has been evidence from epidemiological studies, human and animal intervention experiments, supporting the links between high rate of salt intake and hypertension. A Cochrane review and meta-analysis of clinical trials showed that reduced sodium intake reduces blood pressure in hypertensive and normotensive subjects. Since controlling hypertension is related to a reduced risk of cardiovascular disease, it is plausible that salt consumption is a risk factor for cardiovascular health. However, to properly study the effects of sodium intake levels on the risk of development of cardiovascular disease, long-term studies of large groups using both dietary and biochemical measures are necessary.

As of 2019, major government research organizations, such as the US Centers for Disease Control and Prevention and the European Food Safety Authority, advise consumers to reduce their salt consumption to lower the risk of cardiovascular diseases. One 2016 review found that five studies supported the evidence that reduced sodium intake lowers cardiovascular disease incidence and mortality, three contradicted this evidence, and two found insufficient evidence to conclude. The survey found 27 primary studies and 106 letters in academic journals in support of the salt evidence, 34 primary studies and 51 letters contradicting the evidence, and 7 primary studies and 19 letters that were inconclusive. There are several long-term studies which found that groups with sodium-reduced diets have lower incidence of cardiovascular disease in all demographics.

Some researchers cast doubts on the link between lowering sodium intake and the health of a given population.

=== Current trends and campaigns ===
Government regulatory agencies and clinical organizations, the European Food Safety Authority, the US Centers for Disease Control, and the American Heart Association recommend that consumers use less salt in their diets, mainly to reduce the risk of high blood pressure and associated cardiovascular diseases in adults and children. The World Health Organization issued a 2016 fact sheet to encourage reducing global salt consumption by 30% through 2025.

In 2015, the United States Centers for Disease Control and Prevention began an initiative encouraging Americans to reduce their consumption of salty foods. The American Heart Association defined a daily sodium consumption limit of 1,500 milligrams (contained in less than 0.75 teaspoon of table salt).

According to a 2012 Health Canada report, Canadians in all age groups are consuming 3400 mg per day of sodium, more than twice as much as needed. The US Centers for Disease Control and Prevention stated that the average daily sodium intake for Americans over 2 years of age is 3,436 milligrams. The majority of sodium consumed by North Americans is from processed and restaurant foods, while only a small portion is added during cooking or at the table.

In the European Union, half of the member states legislated change in the form of taxation, mandatory nutrition labeling, and regulated nutrition and health claims to address overconsumption of sodium in response to a 2012 EU Salt Reduction Framework.

== Sodium sensitivity ==
A diet high in sodium increases the risk of hypertension in people with sodium sensitivity, which in turn raises the risk of health issues associated with hypertension, including cardiovascular disease.

Unfortunately, there is no universally accepted definition of sodium sensitivity, and the methods used to assess it vary across studies. In most studies, sodium sensitivity is defined by changes in mean blood pressure in response to variations in sodium intake, either through an increase or decrease. Typically, sodium sensitivity is assessed by measuring circulating fluid volume and peripheral vascular resistance. Several studies have shown a relationship between sodium sensitivity and the increase in circulating fluid volume or peripheral vascular resistance.

Several factors are associated with sodium sensitivity, including demographic variables such as race, gender, and age. One study shows that the American population of African descent is significantly more salt-sensitive than Caucasians. Women are found to be more sodium-sensitive than men; one possible explanation is based on the fact that women tend to consume more salt per unit weight, as women weigh less than men on average. Several studies have shown that an increase in age is also associated with the occurrence of sodium sensitivity.

The difference in genetic makeup and family history has a significant impact on salt sensitivity and is being studied more with improvement on the efficiencies and techniques of genetic testing. In both hypertensive and non-hypertensive individuals, those with haptoglobin 1-1 phenotype are more likely to have sodium sensitivity than people with haptoglobin 2-1 or 2-2 phenotypes. More specifically, haptoglobin 2-2 phenotypes contribute to the characteristic of sodium resistance in humans. Moreover, the prevalence of a family history of hypertension is strongly linked with the occurrence of sodium sensitivity.

The influence of physiological factors including renal function and insulin levels on sodium sensitivity are shown in various studies. One study concludes that the effect of kidney failure on sodium sensitivity is substantial due to the contribution of decreasing the Glomerular filtration rate (GFR) in the kidney. Moreover, insulin resistance is found to be related to sodium sensitivity; however, the actual mechanism is still unknown.

Approximately 15% of adults have inverse salt sensitivity, with blood pressure increasing from eating less salt.

== Potassium and hypertension ==
Possible mechanisms by which high dietary potassium intake reduces the risk of hypertension and cardiovascular disease have been proposed but remain insufficiently studied. However, studies have found a strong inverse association between long-term adequate to high rates of potassium intake and the development of cardiovascular diseases.

The recommended dietary intake of potassium is higher than that of sodium. However, the average absolute intake of potassium of studied populations is lower than that of sodium intake. According to Statistics Canada in 2007, Canadians' potassium intake in all age groups was lower than recommended, while sodium intake greatly exceeded recommended intake in every age group.

The ratio of potassium to sodium intake may help explain the large differences in hypertension rates between populations that primarily consume unprocessed or minimally processed foods (such as certain Indigenous and traditional rural communities) and those following Western diets, which are typically high in processed foods.

== Salt substitutes ==
The growing awareness of excessive sodium consumption in connection with hypertension and cardiovascular disease has increased the usage of salt substitutes at both a consumer and industrial level.

On a consumer level, salt substitutes, which usually substitute a portion of sodium chloride content with potassium chloride, can be used to increase the potassium-to-sodium consumption ratio. This change has been shown to blunt the effects of excess salt intake on hypertension and cardiovascular disease. It has also been suggested that salt substitutes can be used to provide an essential portion of daily potassium intake and may even be more economical than prescription potassium supplements.

In the food industry, processes have been developed to create low-sodium versions of existing products. The meat industry especially has developed and fine-tuned methods to decrease salt contents in processed meats without sacrificing consumer acceptance. Research demonstrates that salt substitutes such as potassium chloride and synergistic compounds such as phosphates can be used to decrease salt content in meat products.

There have been concerns with certain populations' use of potassium chloride as a substitute for salt, as high potassium loads are dangerous for groups with diabetes, renal diseases, or heart failure. The use of salts with minerals such as natural salts has also been tested, but, like salt substitutes partially containing potassium, mineral salts produce a bitter taste above certain levels.

== See also ==
- Salt
- Hypertension
- Cardiovascular disease
