= Labile hypertension =

Labile Hypertension
- Graphic image that shows vasoconstricting and vasodilation of a blood vessel to show fluctuation in blood pressure
- Specialty: Cardiology
- Risk factors: Cardiovascular disease, stroke
- Diagnostic method: Blood pressure measurements
- Prevention: avoidance of smoking, limited alcohol intake, reduced intake of salt and caffeine

Labile hypertension occurs when there are unexpected changes in blood pressure. The term can be used to describe when people have blood pressure measurements that abruptly fluctuate from being abnormally high, approximately 140/90mm Hg or over and returns to its normal range.

Patients who have labile hypertension may have higher cardiac output and lower total peripheral resistance than others. Behavioural and lifestyle factors are the two main factors that cause labile hypertension to occur. Extrinsic factors such as physical activities, insomnia and intake of sodium are likely to increase the occurrence of labile hypertension. Reduced arterial compliance and baroreflex failure may contribute to trigger a response as well. Diagnosis is typically by 24 hours ambulatory blood pressure monitoring to which measurements can be taken at home without having to visit to the physician’s office.

Labile hypertension can be a primary risk factor that may contribute to stroke or cardiovascular disease (CVD). Prevention of life threatening complications involves lifestyle changes such as avoidance of smoking and reducing the amount of salt, caffeine and alcohol intake. There are no set criteria to treat labile hypertension as there are many underlying mechanisms and symptoms. Because stressors are the main cause of labile hypertension, common treatment may involve prescription medications such as anti-anxiety tablets to reduce emotional stressors, and otherwise, as well as decrease the risk of labile hypertension.

== Types ==
There are two different types of hypertension, although the underlying mechanisms to which the blood pressure fluctuates from being normal to abnormally high remains the same.

- Labile hypertension: Normally occur during emotional or social stressors and may not physically show symptoms. Currently, there are limitations of current knowledge behind the mechanisms of labile hypertension and clinicians are still finding future clinical management.
- Paroxysmal hypertension: Occur randomly during the day but it is said that paroxysmal hypertension are caused by repressed distressed emotions such as intense fear due to past trauma. Some of the physical symptoms that accompany include headache, weakness and fear. Paroxysmal hypertension is different from panic disorder in which they are characterised with extreme elevation of blood pressure that is not triggered by fear. In panic disorder, elevation of blood pressure is generally mild and is normally triggered by fear or panic. There is a small percentage, approximately 2% who raises suspicion for have pheochromocytoma, a tumour in the adrenal glands. This involves the sympathetic nervous system and treatment for paroxysmal hypertension is available.

== Symptoms and signs ==
Generally, labile hypertension does not present any physical symptoms during fluctuations of blood pressure. Elevation and decrease of blood pressure reading usually occurs without intervention. However, if the normal resting pressure remains abnormally excessive, common signs and symptoms that are present include: Headache, Heart palpitations, Flushing, Tinnitus (ringing or buzzing noise in one or both ears), Weakness of body, Dizziness and diaphoresis. Some may describe the episodes as abrupt in onset such that they were not evoked by stress. Episodes of these symptoms may range from half an hour to many hours and frequently of attacks ranged from once or twice a day to a few months.

=== Complications ===
Typically, an increase in blood pressure may put strain on the heart and possibly other organs that may cause damage to the blood vessels, eyes and the heart. Uncontrollable increase in blood pressure can cause damage to the arteries that are present around kidneys, and thus restrict the blood to deliver. Due to inconsistent fluctuations in blood pressure, this can cause additional problems to people with pre-existing heart or blood vessel conditions such as angina, cerebral aneurysm or aortic aneurysm. Uncontrolled pressure in the blood can lead to further complications such as vascular dementia as the narrowed arteries can reduce and limit blood flow to the brain.

== Causes ==
It is important to understand that it is common for blood pressure to rise and fall dramatically when dealing with stressors in people’s everyday life. While these can be normal, others may be serious. Possible causes alone or in conjunction that can cause labile hypertension are in the following criteria.

- Caffeine: consumption of caffeine may constrict blood vessels that may stimulate and display unexpected spikes in blood pressure. Researchers believe that caffeine could possibly block hormones that normally keep arteries widened. Caffeine may also cause adrenal glands to release adrenaline which causes the blood pressure to dramatically increase.
- White Coat Syndrome: occurs in situations when people are anxious with their visit to the doctor or General Practitioner (GP) which can elevate blood pressure readings.
- Pheochromocytoma: Normally, in a healthy person, the non-cancerous tumour that is present in the adrenal gland is responsible for releasing hormones that can cause the blood pressure to change. However, if diagnosed with Pheochromocytoma, there will be a neuroendocrine tumour that is found in the adrenal gland which can cause overproduction of induced hormones that can lead to episodic of high blood pressure.
- Salt: People may develop blood pressure spikes in high sodium intake that is contained in meals. High sodium intake may put extra strain in arteries which causes the muscles in the artery walls to become thicker. The radius inside the artery space will be smaller. As the arteries are constricted, organs such as the heart that receives the blood from the arteries decreases. This will reduces the amount of oxygen and nutrients they need and may cause possible damage to organs. At early stage, it may cause a slight reduction of blood flowing to the heart that may lead to angina. Salt can also cause damage to the brain such that there is reduction of blood that reaches the brain and may lead to vascular dementia. According to The American Heart Association (AHA), recommended maximum daily sodium intake is 2,300 mg while the optimum goal is a sodium intake of less than 1,500 mg per day. This corresponds to 5.75 g and 3.75 g of table salt (sodium chloride), respectively, since 2.5 g of salt contains 1 g of sodium.
- Anxiety: environmental stressors are exposed in daily lives that can cause sudden increase in blood pressure. For example, emotional stressors leads to severe increase of arterial blood pressure.
- Baroreflex failure: In the human body, baroreflexes maintain blood pressure homeostasis. Typically, the three circumstances that baroreflexes can fail are: problems with the central processing, damage to the Autonomic Nervous System which is associated with damage to parasympathetic and sympathetic damage and damage to carotid sinus that can cause failure to afferent signalling.

Labile hypertension can occur through exposure to everyday lifestyles. Some of these include are the usage of tobacco. Tobacco significantly increase blood pressure and heart rate temporarily and can damage the artery walls caused by the chemicals that are contained in tobacco. Chemicals in tobacco include nicotine and carbon monoxide interferes with the cardiovascular system (CVD). Nicotine is a stimulant that releases vasopressin, and can cause the blood vessel to constrict and thus can reduce the amount of blood to flow. Carbon monoxide is a toxic chemical that binds haemoglobin (molecule in the blood that carries oxygen) will decrease the amount of oxygen delivered to the cells and cause damage to other organs in the body.

Damage to the arterial walls can cause vasoconstriction, allowing the arteries to narrow which can increase the risk of heart disease. Drinking too much alcohol moderately (more than one drink for women and two drinks for men) can cause damage to the heart. Researchers have found that heavy drinkers can lead to episodes of tachycardia, a problem with the electrical signalling that can elevate heart rate. Frequent drinking can lead blood clots and may increase severity of heart attack or stroke.

== Diagnosis ==
Ambulatory blood pressure monitoring: A non-invasive portable device that can monitor and record blood pressure automatically during specific time of the day, especially is focused on people who have White Coat Syndrome as it can reduce the elevation of blood pressure during the visit in the examination room. This can allow doctors to identify results and observe patterns. Patients who normally undergo ambulatory blood pressure monitoring are suggested to keep record on the periods of awake and asleep times, medication intake and periods when exposed to exercise. This allows the clinicians to eliminate the transition periods when blood pressure rapidly elevates.

The blood pressure reading is recorded as two numbers, systolic and diastolic. The systolic blood pressure represents the amount of pressure the blood is applying against artery walls during heartbeats whereas the diastolic blood pressure shows while the heart is resting between beats.

Electrocardiogram (EKG or ECG): A clinical test to measure and record electrical conductivity of the heart. It helps determine defects of heart electrical activity, rhythm and rate to help assist in diagnosis of heart defects that may affect in heart rhythm such as tachycardia and coronary artery blood flow (e.g. ischemia). Electrodes are placed on the surface of the skin and connected to the amplifier to detect electrical changes in the cardiac muscle when it is depolarising and repolarising.

== Treatment ==
There are no specific set criteria to treat labile hypertension. This is because the condition is not yet well defined and makes it difficult for doctors to treat labile hypertension as medications are usually given for patients who have hypertension. Generally, doctors will suggest people to monitor and observe their blood pressure throughout the day, preferably for 24 hours, as commonly prescribed medications available today for blood pressure may not be effective. Because labile hypertension is mainly caused by anxiety, in occurrence to short term situations, doctors will often prescribe anti-anxiety medications that may help reduce any stressors. Some of the common medications to reduce anxiety includes:

- Alprazolam (Xanax): oral tablet that has an enhancing effect to help prevent panic or anxiety disorders.
- Clonazepam (Klonopin): oral tablet that helps prevent seizures and panic attacks.
- Diazepam (Valium): may help reduce the effect of anxiety when withdrawal with alcohol intake.
- Lorazepam (Ativan): Should be taken in short period of time between 2-4weeks that reduces anxiety.

Long-term treatment of anxiety that requires daily medication would include: Paroxetine (Paxil), Sertraline (Zoloft), Escitalopram (Lexapro), Citalopram (Celexa). Otherwise, a prescription drug called Clonidine is used to lower blood pressure by relaxing the blood vessels. This will prevent life threatening problems such as stroke, heart attacks and kidney problems.

Beta blockers are medications that often prevent paroxysmal and labile hypertension as they interact with the sympathetic nervous system. Beta blockers help reduce blood pressure by blocking the effects of hormone epinephrine, also known as adrenaline. The effect of taking beta blockers can help lower the heart rate as well as help improve the blood flow by opening up the blood vessels widely. Doctors may prescribe beta blockers as one of the medications that help reduce blood pressure, including diuretics and calcium channel blockers.

=== Management ===
Labile hypertension can be initially treated through behavioural modifications. Behavioural factors such as the mental activity of an individual or emotional status should be managed. Anxiety is one of the common forms of mental illness, there are increasing risks that can affect physical health problems. Therefore, to reduce stress and anxiety, reduction to smoking and alcohol, decreasing intake of salt or having regular aerobic activity are some examples of therapy that can help manage cases of labile hypertension. By reducing alcohol intake, the systolic blood pressure will lower by 2-4mm Hg and the diastolic blood pressure by 1–2 mm Hg.

However, doctors will preferably suggest patients to monitor blood pressure at home during modification of lifestyle and behavioural changes.

== Epidemiology ==
The prevalence of labile hypertension in USA is estimated to have more than 40 million adults which can develop the risks of hemorrhagic stroke. Labile hypertension is most common in Charlottesville, Virginia with up to 11% of the population. Average age who have labile hypertension is 64±13 years. It was found that ageing was one of the characteristics that highly associates with fluctuations of blood pressure such that during day or night time, the systolic and diastolic pressure alternates and shows abnormal diurnal pattern.
