= History of hypertension =

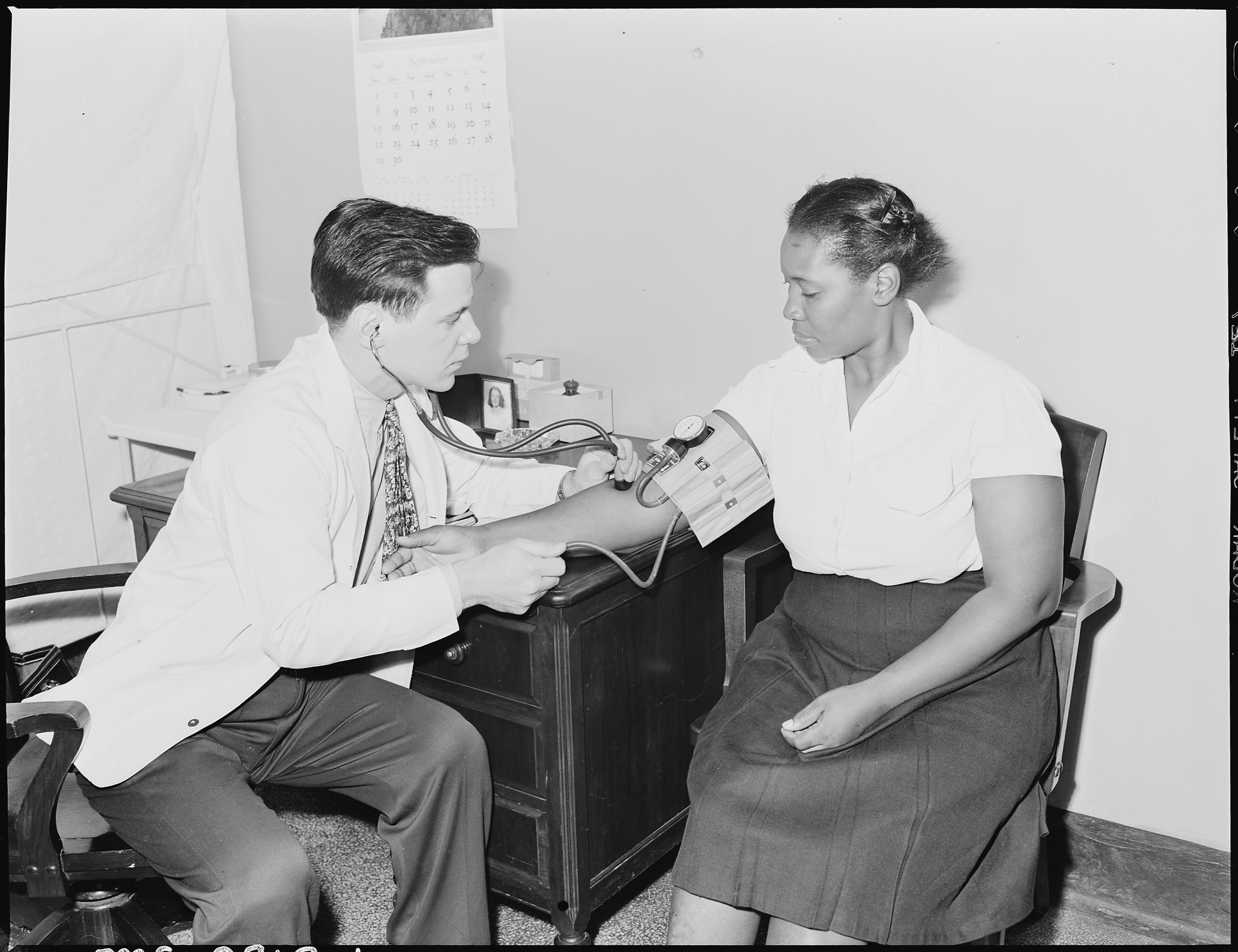
Lynch, Kentucky, 1946. Photo by Russell Lee.

The modern history of hypertension begins with the understanding of the cardiovascular system based on the work of physician William Harvey (1578–1657), who described the circulation of blood in his book De motu cordis. The English clergyman Stephen Hales made the first published measurement of blood pressure in 1733. Descriptions of what would come to be called hypertension came from, among others, Thomas Young in 1808 and especially Richard Bright in 1836. Bright noted a link between cardiac hypertrophy and kidney disease, and subsequently kidney disease was often termed Bright's disease in this period. In 1850 George Johnson suggested that the thickened blood vessels seen in the kidney in Bright's disease might be an adaptation to elevated blood pressure. William Senhouse Kirkes in 1855 and Ludwig Traube in 1856 also proposed, based on pathological observations, that elevated pressure could account for the association between left ventricular hypertrophy to kidney damage in Bright's disease. Samuel Wilks observed that left ventricular hypertrophy and diseased arteries were not necessarily associated with diseased kidneys, implying that high blood pressure might occur in people with healthy kidneys; however, the first report of elevated blood pressure in a person without evidence of kidney disease was made by Frederick Akbar Mahomed in 1874 using a sphygmograph. The concept of hypertensive disease as a generalized circulatory disease was taken up by Sir Clifford Allbutt, who termed the condition "hyperpiesia". However, hypertension as a medical entity really came into being in 1896 with the invention of the cuff-based sphygmomanometer by Scipione Riva-Rocci in 1896, which allowed blood pressure to be measured in the clinic. In 1905, Nikolai Korotkoff improved the technique by describing the Korotkoff sounds that are heard when the artery is ausculted with a stethoscope while the sphygmomanometer cuff is deflated. Tracking serial blood pressure measurements was further enhanced when Donald Nunn invented an accurate fully automated oscillometric sphygmomanometer device in 1981.

The term essential hypertension ('Essentielle Hypertonie') was coined by Eberhard Frank in 1911 to describe elevated blood pressure for which no cause could be found. In 1928, the term malignant hypertension was coined by physicians from the Mayo Clinic to describe a syndrome of very high blood pressure, severe retinopathy and inadequate kidney function which usually resulted in death within a year from strokes, heart failure or kidney failure. A prominent individual with severe hypertension was Franklin D. Roosevelt. However, while the menace of severe or malignant hypertension was well recognised, the risks of more moderate elevations of blood pressure were uncertain and the benefits of treatment doubtful. Consequently, hypertension was often classified into "malignant" and "benign". In 1931, John Hay, Professor of Medicine at Liverpool University, wrote that "there is some truth in the saying that the greatest danger to a man with a high blood pressure lies in its discovery, because then some fool is certain to try and reduce it". This view was echoed in 1937 by US cardiologist Paul Dudley White, who suggested that "hypertension may be an important compensatory mechanism which should not be tampered with, even if we were certain that we could control it". Charles Friedberg's 1949 classic textbook "Diseases of the Heart", stated that "people with 'mild benign' hypertension ... [defined as blood pressures up to levels of 210/100 mm Hg] ... need not be treated". However, the tide of medical opinion was turning: it was increasingly recognised in the 1950s that "benign" hypertension was not harmless. Over the next decade increasing evidence accumulated from actuarial reports and longitudinal studies, such as the Framingham Heart Study, that "benign" hypertension increased death and cardiovascular disease, and that these risks increased in a graded manner with increasing blood pressure across the whole spectrum of population blood pressures. Subsequently, the National Institutes of Health also sponsored other population studies, which additionally showed that African Americans had a higher burden of hypertension and its complications.

== Treatment and medications ==
Historically the treatment for what was called the "hard pulse disease" consisted in reducing the quantity of blood by blood letting or the application of leeches. This was advocated by The Yellow Emperor of China, Cornelius Celsus, Galen, and Hippocrates.

In the late 19th and early to mid 20th centuries, many therapies were used to treat hypertension, but few were effective, and these were poorly tolerated. Therapies used in that period included strict sodium restriction (for example the rice diet), sympathectomy (surgical ablation of parts of the sympathetic nervous system), and pyrogen therapy (injection of substances that caused a fever, indirectly reducing blood pressure). The first chemical for hypertension, sodium thiocyanate, was used in 1900 but had many side effects and was unpopular. Other treatments, such as barbiturates, bismuth, and bromides were mainly supportive rather than therapeutic. Other drugs were used after the Second World War, the most popular and reasonably effective of which were tetramethylammonium chloride and its derivative hexamethonium. Also used in the post-war period were hydralazine and reserpine (derived from the medicinal plant Rauvolfia serpentina).

A major breakthrough was achieved in the 1950s with the discovery of well-tolerated oral diuretics, the first of which was chlorothiazide (Diuril). This was derived from the antibiotic sulfanilamide and became available in 1958. A randomized controlled trial sponsored by the Veterans Administration comparing hydrochlorothiazide plus reserpine plus hydralazine versus placebo had to be stopped early because those not receiving treatment developed many more complications and it was deemed unethical to withhold treatment from them. The study continued in people with lower blood pressures and showed that treatment even in people with mild hypertension more than halved the risk of cardiovascular death. In 1975, the Lasker Special Public Health Award was awarded to the team that developed chlorothiazide. The results of these studies prompted public health campaigns to increase public awareness of hypertension and promoted the measurement and treatment of high blood pressure. These measures appear to have contributed at least in part to the observed 50% fall in stroke and ischemic heart disease between 1972 and 1994.

Soon more drugs became available to treat hypertension. The British physician James W. Black developed beta blockers in the early 1960s; these were initially used for angina, but turned out to lower blood pressure. Black received the 1976 Lasker Award and in 1988 the Nobel Prize in Physiology or Medicine for his discovery. The next class of antihypertensives to be discovered were calcium channel blockers. The first member was verapamil, a derivative of papaverine that was initially thought to be a beta blocker and used for angina, but then turned out to have a different mode of action and was shown to lower blood pressure. The renin–angiotensin system was known to play an important role in blood pressure regulation, and angiotensin converting enzyme (ACE) inhibitors were developed through rational drug design. In 1977 captopril, an orally active agent, was described; this led to the development of a number of other ACE inhibitors. More recently angiotensin receptor blockers and renin inhibitors have also been introduced as antihypertensive agents.
