= Systolic hypertension =

- Specialty: Cardiology

In medicine, systolic hypertension is defined as an elevated systolic blood pressure (SBP). If the systolic blood pressure is elevated (>140) with a normal (<90) diastolic blood pressure (DBP), it is called isolated systolic hypertension. Eighty percent of people with systolic hypertension are over the age of 65 years old. Isolated systolic hypertension is a specific type of widened (or high) pulse pressure.

== Causes ==
Systolic hypertension may be due to reduced compliance of the aorta with increasing age. This increases the load on the ventricle and compromises coronary blood flow, eventually resulting in left ventricular hypertrophy, coronary ischemia, and heart failure.

Contemporary science shows an immersed boundary method of computational illustration of a single heartbeat. Applied to physiologic models, immersed boundary theory sees the heart as a great folded semisolid sail fielding and retrieving a viscous blood mass. The sail, likened to Windkessel effect physiology, gives and receives a load under time-ordered phases. Decreasing compliance of the sail heralds the onset of systolic hypertension.

== Treatment ==
The goal of treating systolic hypertension is to delay and reduce the extent of damage to the heart, the cerebrovascular system, and the kidneys. This also decreases the risk of cardiovascular disease and morbidity. Lifestyle interventions are alternative solutions to treating systolic hypertension. Examples include a diet low in sodium (salt) and rich in whole grains, fruits, and vegetables.

A low sodium diet should contain a maximum sodium intake of 2.0 grams (approximately 5.0 grams of salt). Additional salt and processed foods should also be avoided.

Clinical trials have also documented the beneficial effects of weight loss, increased physical activity, and limiting alcohol consumption. For hypertensive men, alcoholic drinks should be reduced to 14 units per week. For hypertensive women, alcoholic drinks should be reduced to 8 units per week. (1 unit corresponds to 1/8 liter of wine or 1/4 liter of beer).

In addition to lifestyle changes, medication can also be used to reduce systolic hypertension to safe levels.

Common medications used to treat systolic hypertension include a thiazide-type diuretic (TTD) or calcium channel blockers (CCB), or a combination of the two.

=== Goal ===
Based on these studies, treating to a systolic blood pressure of 140, as long as the diastolic blood pressure is 68 or more, seems safe. Corroborating this, a reanalysis of the SHEP data suggests allowing the diastolic to go below 70 may increase adverse effects.

A meta-analysis of individual patient data from randomized controlled trials found the lowest diastolic blood pressure for which cardiovascular outcomes improve is 85 mm Hg for untreated hypertensives and 80 mm Hg for treated hypertensives. The authors concluded "poor health conditions leading to low blood pressure and an increased risk for death probably explain the J-shaped curve". Interpreting the meta-analysis is difficult, but avoiding a diastolic blood pressure below 68–70 mm Hg seems reasonable because:

- The low value of 85 mm Hg for treated hypertensives in the meta-analysis is higher than the value of 68–70 mm Hg that is suggested by the two major randomized controlled trials of isolated systolic hypertension
- The two largest trials in the meta-analysis, Hypertension Detection and Follow-up Program (HDFP) and Medical Research Council trial in mild hypertension (MRC1) were predominantly middle-aged subjects, all of whom had diastolic hypertension before treatment.
- The independent contributions of diseases and factors other than hypertension versus effects of treatment are not clear in the meta-analysis.

An updated 2020 Cochrane review found that in the general population of individuals with elevated blood pressure interventions to achieve a lower blood pressure target beyond a standard (≤ 140/90 mm Hg) create more harms than no intervention. Further research is needed, the results of this review were applicable mainly to older individuals with moderate to high cardiovascular risk.

In 2019, a systematic review of anti-hypertensive treatment trials in elderly patients with isolated systolic hypertension demonstrated results with the intensive decrease of SBP to <140 mm Hg. All cause mortality was diminished for 24% and cardiovascular mortality for 39%
