= Ambulatory blood pressure =

Technique for measuring blood pressure over regular intervals

Ambulatory blood pressure monitoring
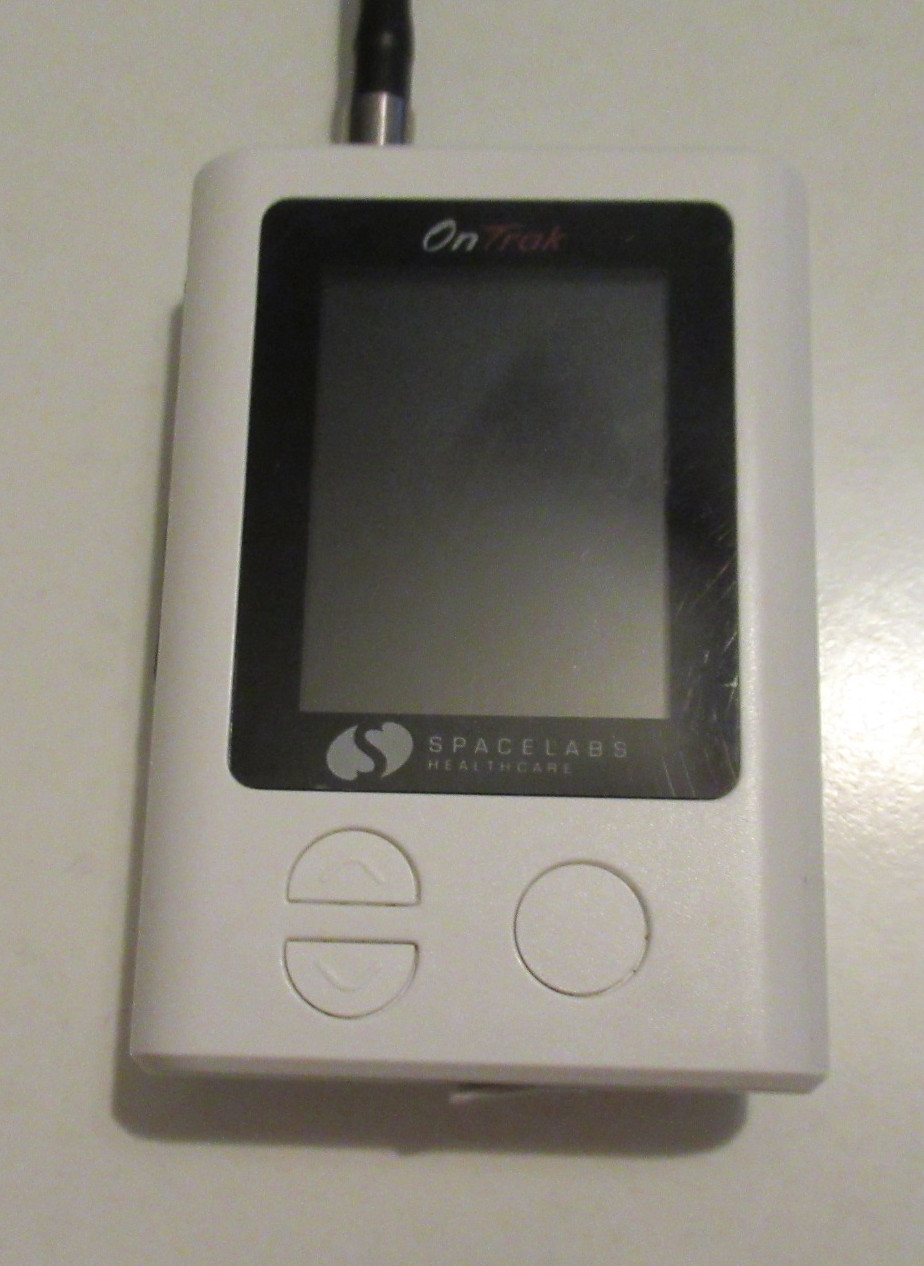
- MeSH: D018660

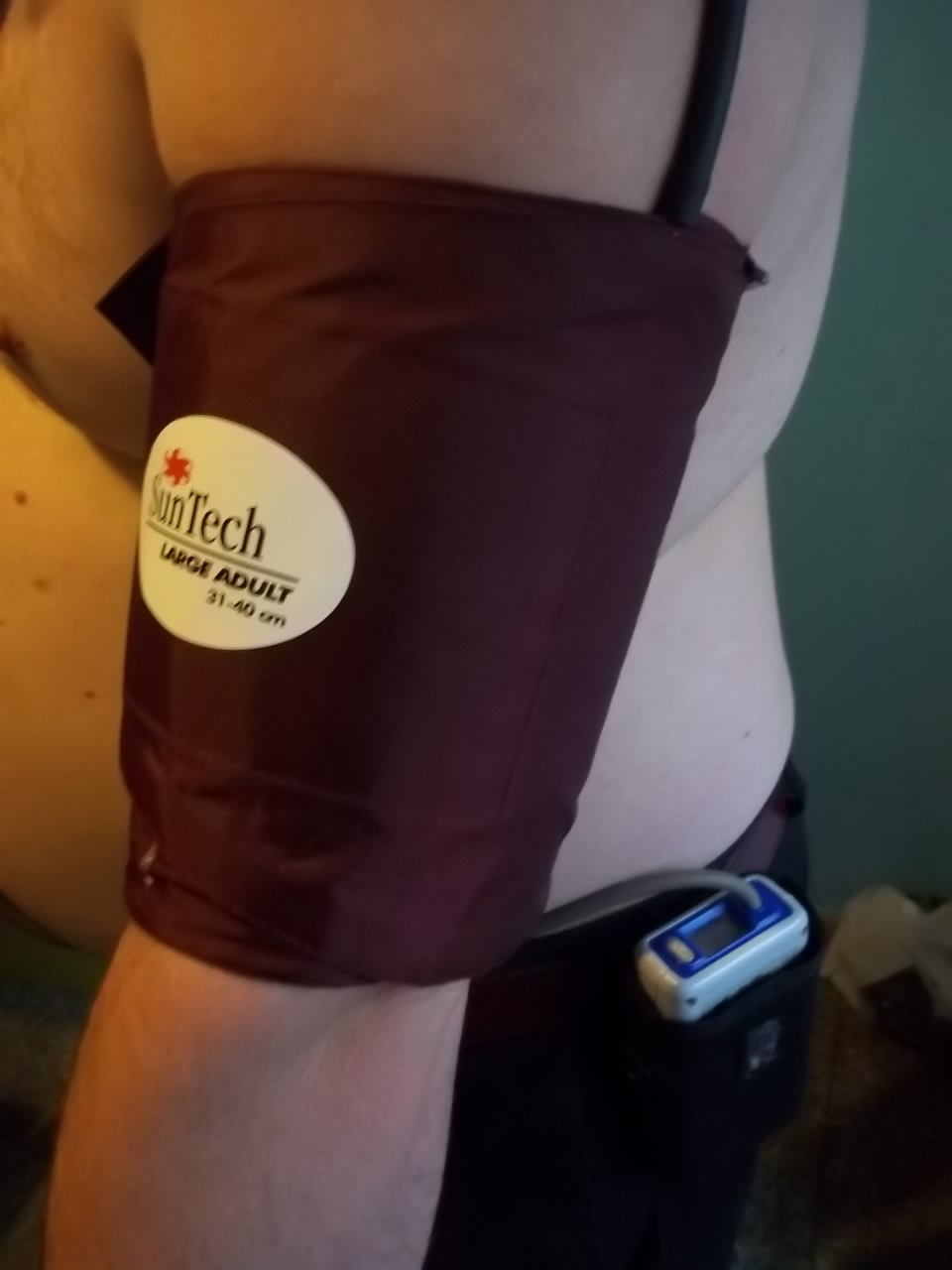
Male patient wearing an ABPM device

Ambulatory blood pressure, as opposed to office blood pressure and home blood pressure, is the blood pressure over the course of the full 24-hour sleep-wake cycle. Ambulatory blood pressure monitoring (ABPM) measures blood pressure at regular intervals throughout the day and night. It avoids the white coat hypertension effect in which a patient's blood pressure is elevated during the examination process due to nervousness and anxiety caused by being in a clinical setting. ABPM can also detect the reverse condition, masked hypertension, where the patient has normal blood pressure during the examination but uncontrolled blood pressure outside the clinical setting, masking a high 24-hour average blood pressure. Out-of-office measurements are highly recommended as an adjunct to office measurements by almost all hypertension organizations.

== Blood pressure variability ==
24-hour, non-invasive ambulatory blood pressure (BP) monitoring allows estimates of cardiac risk factors including excessive BP variability or patterns of circadian variability known to increase risks of a cardiovascular event.

== Nocturnal hypertension ==
Ambulatory blood pressure monitoring allows blood pressure to be intermittently monitored during sleep and is useful to determine whether the patient is a "dipper" or "non-dipper"—that is to say, whether or not blood pressure falls at night compared to daytime values. A nighttime fall is normal and desirable. It correlates with relationship depth, and also other factors such as sleep quality, age, hypertensive status, marital status, and social network support. Absence of a nighttime dip is associated with poorer health outcomes; a 2011 study found increased mortality. Nocturnal hypertension is also associated with end organ damage, and is a much better indicator than the daytime blood pressure reading.

== Target organ damage ==
Readings revealing possible hypertension-related end organ damage, such as left ventricular hypertrophy or narrowing of the retinal arteries, are more likely to be obtained through ambulatory blood pressure monitoring than through clinical blood pressure measurement. Isolated clinical BP measurements are more subject to the general marked variability of BP measurements. Clinical measurements may be affected by the "white coat effect", a rise in the blood pressure of many patients due to the stress of being in the medical situation.

== Overnight reduction or surge in blood pressure ==
Optimal blood pressure fluctuates over a 24-hour sleep-wake cycle, with values rising in the daytime and falling after midnight. The reduction in early morning blood pressure compared with average daytime pressure is referred to as the night-time dip. Ambulatory blood pressure monitoring may reveal a blunted or abolished overnight dip in blood pressure. This is clinically useful information because non-dipping blood pressure is associated with a higher risk of left ventricle hypertrophy and cardiovascular mortality. By comparing the early morning pressures with average daytime pressures, a ratio can be calculated which is of value in assessing relative risk. Dipping patterns are classified by the percent of drop in pressure, and based on the resulting ratios a person may be clinically classified for treatment as a "non-dipper" (with a blood pressure drop of less than 10%), a "dipper", an "extreme dipper", or a "reverse dipper", as detailed in the chart below. Additionally, ambulatory monitoring may reveal an excessive morning blood pressure surge, which is associated with increased risk of stroke in elderly hypertensive people.

Classification of dipping in blood pressure is based on the American Heart Association's calculation, using systolic blood pressure (SBP) as follows:

$$\text{Dip} = \left(1 - \frac{\text{SBP}_\text{Sleeping}}{\text{SBP}_\text{Waking}}\right) \times 100\%$$

Range	Class
<0%	Reverse Dipper
0% - 10%	Non-Dipper
10% - 20%	Dipper
>20%	Extreme Dipper

Dippers have significantly lower all-cause mortality than non-dippers or reverse dippers; "... ambulatory blood pressure predicts mortality significantly better than clinic blood pressure."
