= Blood pressure =

Pressure exerted by circulating blood upon the walls of arteries

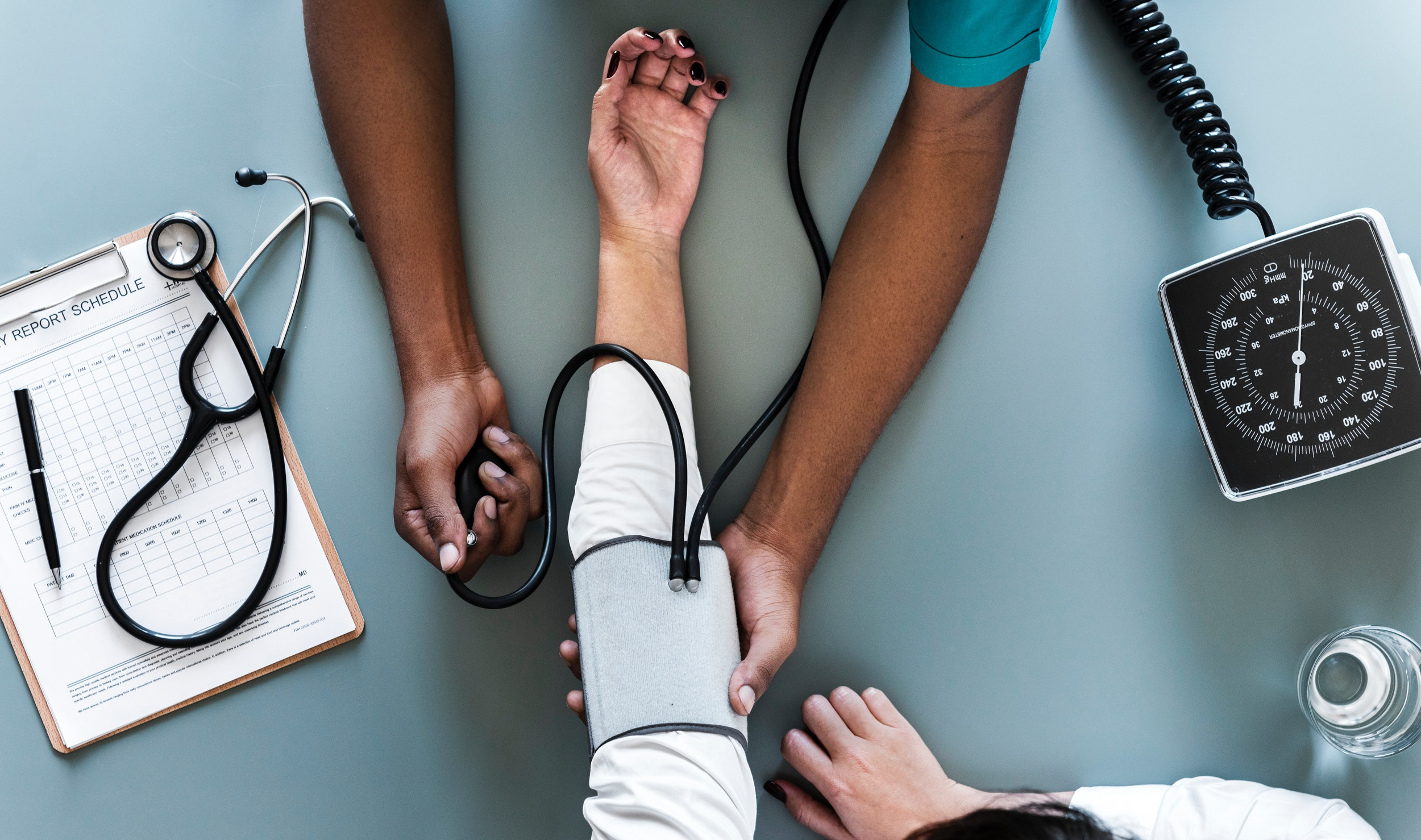
- A healthcare worker measuring blood pressure using a sphygmomanometer.
- MeSH: D001794
- MedlinePlus: 007490
- LOINC: 35094-2

Blood pressure (BP) is the pressure of circulating blood against the walls of blood vessels. Most of this pressure results from the heart pumping blood through the circulatory system. When used without qualification, the term "blood pressure" refers to the pressure in a brachial artery, where it is most commonly measured. Blood pressure is usually expressed in terms of the systolic pressure (maximum pressure during one heartbeat) over diastolic pressure (minimum pressure between heartbeats) in the cardiac cycle. It is measured in millimetres of mercury (mmHg) above the surrounding atmospheric pressure, or in kilopascals (kPa). The difference between the systolic and diastolic pressures is known as pulse pressure, while the average pressure during a cardiac cycle is known as mean arterial pressure.

Blood pressure is one of the vital signs—together with respiratory rate, heart rate, oxygen saturation, and body temperature—that healthcare professionals use in evaluating a patient's health. Normal resting blood pressure in an adult is under 120/80 mmHg according to the AHA and ACC, and under 120/70 mmHg according to the ESC, and over 90/60 mmHg, though low blood pressure is usually not harmful unless it causes symptoms. Globally, the average blood pressure, age-standardized, has remained about the same since 1975 at approximately 127/79 mmHg in men and 122/77 mmHg in women, although these averages mask significant regional differences.

Blood pressure is influenced by cardiac output, systemic vascular resistance, blood volume, and arterial stiffness. It varies depending on a person's situation, emotional state, activity level, and overall health. In the short term, blood pressure is regulated by baroreceptors, which act via the brain to influence the nervous system and endocrine system.

Blood pressure that is too low is called hypotension, pressure that is consistently too high is called hypertension, and normal pressure is called normotension. Both hypertension and hypotension have many causes and may occur suddenly or develop over time. Long-term hypertension is a risk factor for many diseases, including stroke, heart disease, and kidney failure.

== Classification, normal and abnormal values ==
=== Systemic arterial pressure ===
Blood pressure measurements can be influenced by circumstances of measurement. Guidelines use different thresholds for office (also known as clinic), home (when the person measures their own blood pressure at home), and ambulatory blood pressure (using an automated device over a 24-hour period).

Blood pressure classifications
Categories	Systolic blood pressure, mmHg			and/or	Diastolic blood pressure, mmHg		
Method	Office	Home	24h ambulatory	and/or	Office	Home	24h ambulatory
American College of Cardiology/American Heart Association (2017)
Normal	<120	<120	<115	and	<80	<80	<75
Elevated	120–129	120–129	115–124	and	<80	<80	<75
Hypertension, stage 1	130–139	130–134	125–129	or	80–89	80–84	75–79
Hypertension, stage 2	≥140	≥135	≥130	or	≥90	≥85	≥80
European Society of Cardiology (2024)
Non-elevated	<120	<120	<115	and	<70	<70	<65
Elevated	120–139	120–134	115–129	or	70–89	70–84	65–79
Hypertension	≥140	≥135	≥130	or	≥90	≥85	≥80
European Society of Hypertension/International Society of Hypertension (2023)
Optimal	<120	—N/a	—N/a	and	<80	—N/a	—N/a
Normal	120–129	—N/a	—N/a	and/or	80–84	—N/a	—N/a
High normal	130–139	—N/a	—N/a	and/or	85–89	—N/a	—N/a
Hypertension, grade 1	140–159	≥135	≥130	and/or	90–99	≥85	≥80
Hypertension, grade 2	160–179	—N/a	—N/a	and/or	100–109	—N/a	—N/a
Hypertension, grade 3	≥180	—N/a	—N/a	and/or	≥110	—N/a	—N/a

The risk of cardiovascular disease increases progressively above a systolic blood pressure of 90 mmHg.

Observational studies demonstrate that people who maintain arterial pressures at the low end of these pressure ranges have much better long-term cardiovascular health. There is an ongoing medical debate over what is the optimal level of blood pressure to target when using drugs to lower blood pressure with hypertension, particularly in older adults.

Blood pressure fluctuates from minute to minute and normally shows a circadian rhythm over a 24-hour period, with highest readings in the early morning and evenings and lowest readings at night. Loss of the normal fall in blood pressure at night is associated with a greater future risk of cardiovascular disease and there is evidence that night-time blood pressure is a stronger predictor of cardiovascular events than day-time blood pressure. Blood pressure varies over longer time periods (months to years) and this variability predicts adverse outcomes. Blood pressure also changes in response to temperature, noise, emotional stress, consumption of food or liquid, dietary factors, physical activity, changes in posture (such as standing-up), drugs, and disease. The variability in blood pressure and the better predictive value of ambulatory blood pressure measurements has led some authorities, such as the National Institute for Health and Care Excellence (NICE) in the UK, to advocate for the use of ambulatory blood pressure as the preferred method for diagnosis of hypertension.

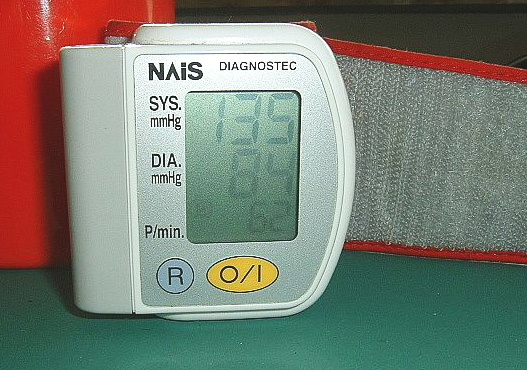
A digital sphygmomanometer used for measuring blood pressure

Various other factors, such as age and sex, also influence a person's blood pressure. Differences between left-arm and right-arm blood pressure measurements tend to be small. However, occasionally there is a consistent difference greater than 10 mmHg which may need further investigation, e.g. for peripheral arterial disease, obstructive arterial disease or aortic dissection.

There is no accepted diagnostic standard for hypotension, although pressures less than 90/60 are commonly regarded as hypotensive. In practice blood pressure is considered too low only if symptoms are present.

=== Systemic arterial pressure and age ===
==== Fetal blood pressure ====
In pregnancy, it is the fetal heart and not the mother's heart that builds up the fetal blood pressure to drive blood through the fetal circulation. The blood pressure in the fetal aorta is approximately 30 mmHg at 20 weeks of gestation, and increases to approximately 45 mmHg at 40 weeks of gestation.

The average blood pressure for full-term infants:

- Systolic 65–95 mmHg
- Diastolic 30–60 mmHg

==== Childhood ====
Reference ranges for blood pressure (BP) in children
Stage	Approximate age	Systolic BP, mmHg	Diastolic BP, mmHg
Infants	0–12 months	75–100	50–70
Toddlers and preschoolers	1–5 years	80–110	50–80
School age	6–12 years	85–120	50–80
Adolescents	13–18 years	95–140	60–90

In children the normal ranges for blood pressure are lower than for adults and depend on height. Reference blood pressure values have been developed for children in different countries, based on the distribution of blood pressure in children of these countries.

==== Aging adults ====
In adults in most societies, systolic blood pressure tends to rise from early adulthood onward, up to at least age 70; diastolic pressure tends to begin to rise at the same time but start to fall earlier in mid-life, approximately age 55. Mean blood pressure rises from early adulthood, plateauing in mid-life, while pulse pressure rises quite markedly after the age of 40. Consequently, in many older people, systolic blood pressure often exceeds the normal adult range, if the diastolic pressure is in the normal range this is termed isolated systolic hypertension. The rise in pulse pressure with age is attributed to increased stiffness of the arteries. An age-related rise in blood pressure is not considered healthy and is not observed in some isolated unacculturated communities.

== Systemic venous pressure ==
Site		Normal pressure range (in mmHg)
Central venous pressure		3–8
Right ventricular pressure	systolic	15–30
Right ventricular pressure	diastolic	3–8
Pulmonary artery pressure	systolic	15–30
Pulmonary artery pressure	diastolic	4–12
Pulmonary vein/ Pulmonary capillary wedge pressure		2–15
Left ventricular pressure	systolic	100–140
Left ventricular pressure	diastolic	3–12

Blood pressure generally refers to the arterial pressure in the systemic circulation. However, measurement of pressures in the venous system and the pulmonary vessels plays an important role in intensive care medicine but requires invasive measurement of pressure using a catheter.

Venous pressure is the vascular pressure in a vein or in the atria of the heart. It is much lower than arterial pressure, with common values of 5 mmHg in the right atrium and 8 mmHg in the left atrium.

Variants of venous pressure include:

- Central venous pressure, which is a good approximation of right atrial pressure, which is a major determinant of right ventricular end diastolic volume. (However, there can be exceptions in some cases.)
- The jugular venous pressure (JVP) is the indirectly observed pressure over the venous system. It can be useful in the differentiation of different forms of heart and lung disease.
- The portal venous pressure is the blood pressure in the portal vein. It is normally 5–10 mmHg

== Pulmonary pressure ==
Normally, the pressure in the pulmonary artery is about 15 mmHg at rest.

Increased blood pressure in the capillaries of the lung causes pulmonary hypertension, leading to interstitial edema if the pressure increases to above 20 mmHg, and to pulmonary edema at pressures above 25 mmHg.

== Aortic pressure ==
Aortic pressure, also called central aortic blood pressure, or central blood pressure, is the blood pressure at the root of the aorta. Elevated aortic pressure has been found to be a more accurate predictor of both cardiovascular events and mortality, as well as structural changes in the heart, than has peripheral blood pressure (such as measured through the brachial artery). Traditionally it involved an invasive procedure to measure aortic pressure, but now there are non-invasive methods of measuring it indirectly without a significant margin of error.

Certain researchers have argued for physicians to begin using aortic pressure, as opposed to peripheral blood pressure, as a guide for clinical decisions. The way antihypertensive drugs impact peripheral blood pressure can often be very different from the way they impact central aortic pressure.

== Mean systemic pressure ==
If the heart is stopped, blood pressure falls, but it does not fall to zero. The remaining pressure measured after cessation of the heart beat and redistribution of blood throughout the circulation is termed the mean systemic pressure or mean circulatory filling pressure; typically this is proximally ~7 mmHg.

== Disorders of blood pressure ==
Disorders of blood pressure control include high blood pressure, low blood pressure, and blood pressure that shows excessive or maladaptive fluctuation.

Overview of main complications of persistent high blood pressure.

=== High blood pressure ===
Arterial hypertension can be an indicator of other problems and may have long-term adverse effects. Sometimes it can be an acute problem, such as in a hypertensive emergency when blood pressure is more than 180/120 mmHg.

Levels of arterial pressure put mechanical stress on the arterial walls. Higher pressures increase heart workload and progression of unhealthy tissue growth (atheroma) that develops within the walls of arteries. The higher the pressure, the more stress that is present and the more atheroma tend to progress and the heart muscle tends to thicken, enlarge and become weaker over time.

Women high blood pressure

Persistent hypertension is one of the risk factors for strokes, heart attacks, heart failure, and arterial aneurysms, and is the leading cause of chronic kidney failure. Even moderate elevation of arterial pressure leads to shortened life expectancy. At severely high pressures, mean arterial pressures 50% or more above average, a person can expect to live no more than a few years unless appropriately treated. For people with high blood pressure, higher heart rate variability (HRV) is a risk factor for atrial fibrillation.

Both high systolic pressure and high pulse pressure (the numerical difference between systolic and diastolic pressures) are risk factors for adverse cardiovascular events. Elevated pulse pressure has been found to be a stronger independent predictor of cardiovascular events, especially in older populations, than has systolic, diastolic, or mean arterial pressure. In some cases, it appears that a decrease in excessive diastolic pressure can actually increase risk, probably due to the increased difference between systolic and diastolic pressures (ie. widened pulse pressure). If systolic blood pressure is elevated (>140 mmHg) with a normal diastolic blood pressure (<90 mmHg), it is called isolated systolic hypertension and may present a health concern. According to the 2017 American Heart Association blood pressure guidelines state that a systolic blood pressure of 130–139 mmHg with a diastolic pressure of 80–89 mmHg is "stage one hypertension".

For those with heart valve regurgitation, a change in its severity may be associated with a change in diastolic pressure. In a study of people with heart valve regurgitation that compared measurements two weeks apart for each person, there was an increased severity of aortic and mitral regurgitation when diastolic blood pressure increased, whereas when diastolic blood pressure decreased, there was a decreased severity.

=== Low blood pressure ===
Blood pressure that is too low is known as hypotension. This is a medical concern if it causes signs or symptoms, such as dizziness, fainting, or in extreme cases in medical emergencies, circulatory shock. Causes of low arterial pressure include sepsis, hypovolemia, bleeding, cardiogenic shock, reflex syncope, hormonal abnormalities such as Addison's disease, and eating disorders – particularly anorexia nervosa and bulimia.

==== Orthostatic hypotension ====
A large fall in blood pressure upon standing (typically a systolic/diastolic blood pressure decrease of >20/10 mmHg) is termed orthostatic hypotension (postural hypotension) and represents a failure of the body to compensate for the effect of gravity on the circulation. Standing results in an increased hydrostatic pressure in the blood vessels of the lower limbs. The consequent distension of the veins below the diaphragm (venous pooling) causes ~500 ml of blood to be relocated from the chest and upper body. This results in a rapid decrease in central blood volume and a reduction of ventricular preload which in turn reduces stroke volume, and mean arterial pressure. Normally this is compensated for by multiple mechanisms, including activation of the autonomic nervous system which increases heart rate, myocardial contractility and systemic arterial vasoconstriction to preserve blood pressure and elicits venous vasoconstriction to decrease venous compliance. Decreased venous compliance also results from an intrinsic myogenic increase in venous smooth muscle tone in response to the elevated pressure in the veins of the lower body.

Other compensatory mechanisms include the veno-arteriolar axon reflex, the 'skeletal muscle pump' and 'respiratory pump'. Together these mechanisms normally stabilize blood pressure within a minute or less. If these compensatory mechanisms fail and arterial pressure and blood flow decrease beyond a certain point, the perfusion of the brain becomes critically compromised (i.e., the blood supply is not sufficient), causing lightheadedness, dizziness, weakness or fainting. Usually this failure of compensation is due to disease, or drugs that affect the sympathetic nervous system. A similar effect is observed following the experience of excessive gravitational forces (G-loading), such as routinely experienced by aerobatic or combat pilots 'pulling Gs' where the extreme hydrostatic pressures exceed the ability of the body's compensatory mechanisms.

=== Variable or fluctuating blood pressure ===
Some fluctuation or variation in blood pressure is normal. Variation in blood pressure that is significantly greater than the norm is known as labile hypertension and is associated with increased risk of cardiovascular disease brain small vessel disease, and dementia independent of the average blood pressure level. Recent evidence from clinical trials has also linked variation in blood pressure to mortality, stroke, heart failure, and cardiac changes that may give rise to heart failure. These data have prompted discussion of whether excessive variation in blood pressure should be treated, even among normotensive older adults.

Older individuals and those who had received blood pressure medications are more likely to exhibit larger fluctuations in pressure, and there is some evidence that different antihypertensive agents have different effects on blood pressure variability; whether these differences translate to benefits in outcome is uncertain.

== Physiology ==
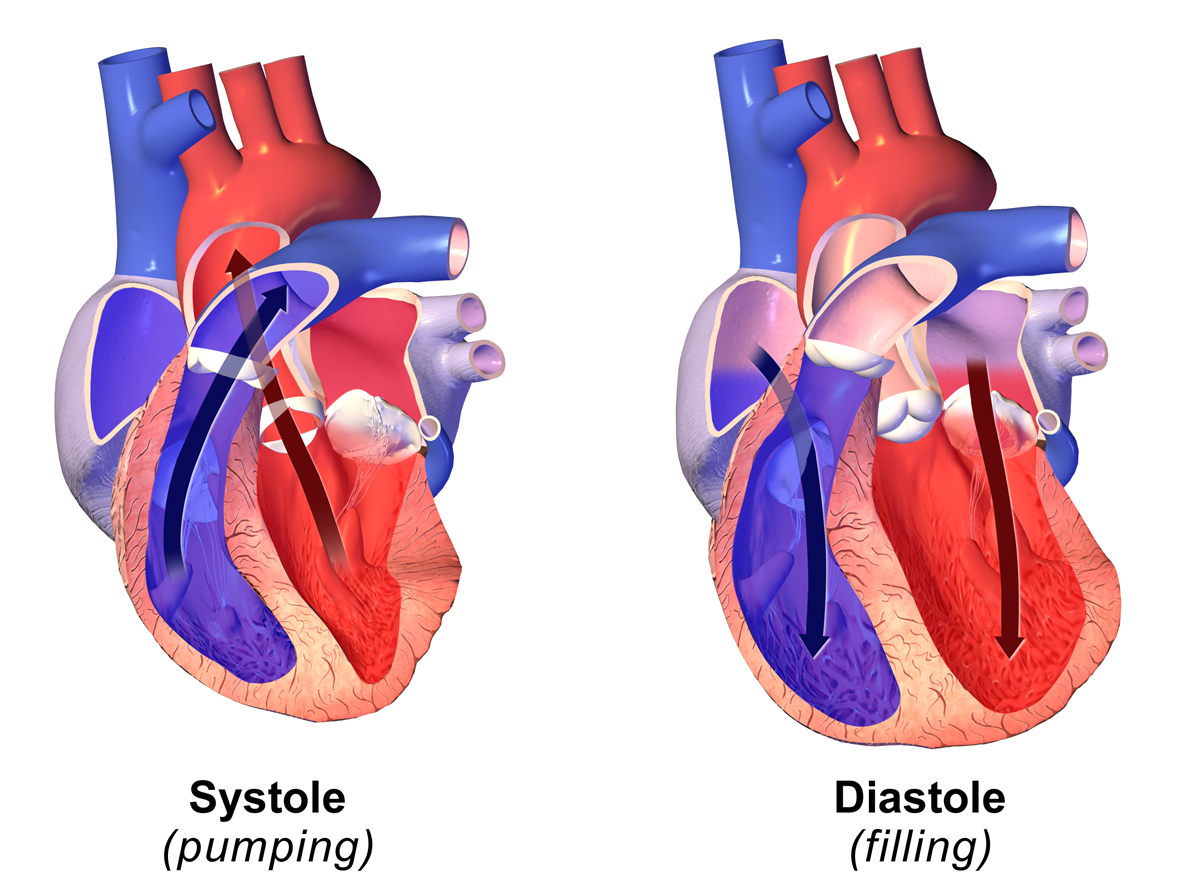
Cardiac systole and diastole

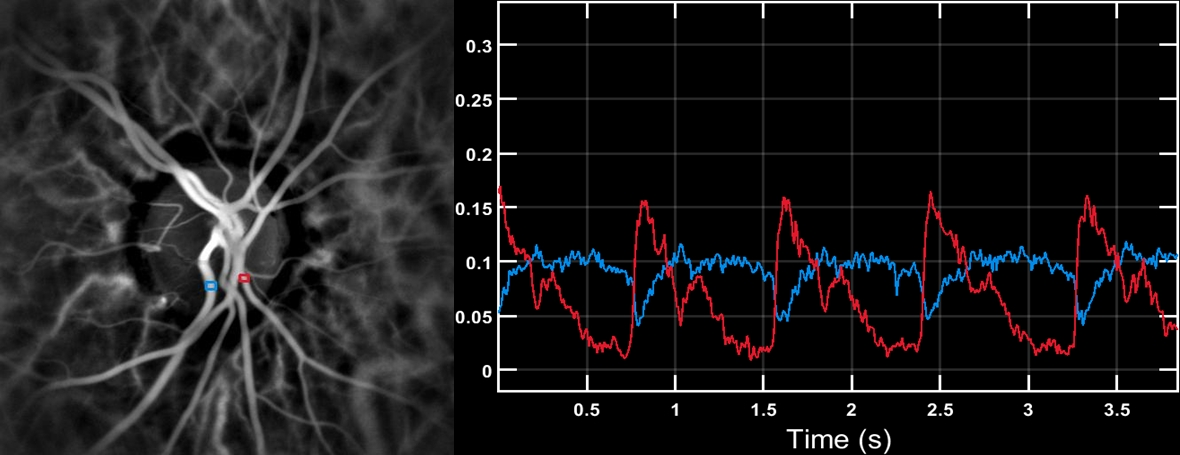
Blood flow velocity waveforms in the central retinal artery (red) and vein (blue), measured by laser Doppler imaging in the eye fundus of a healthy volunteer.

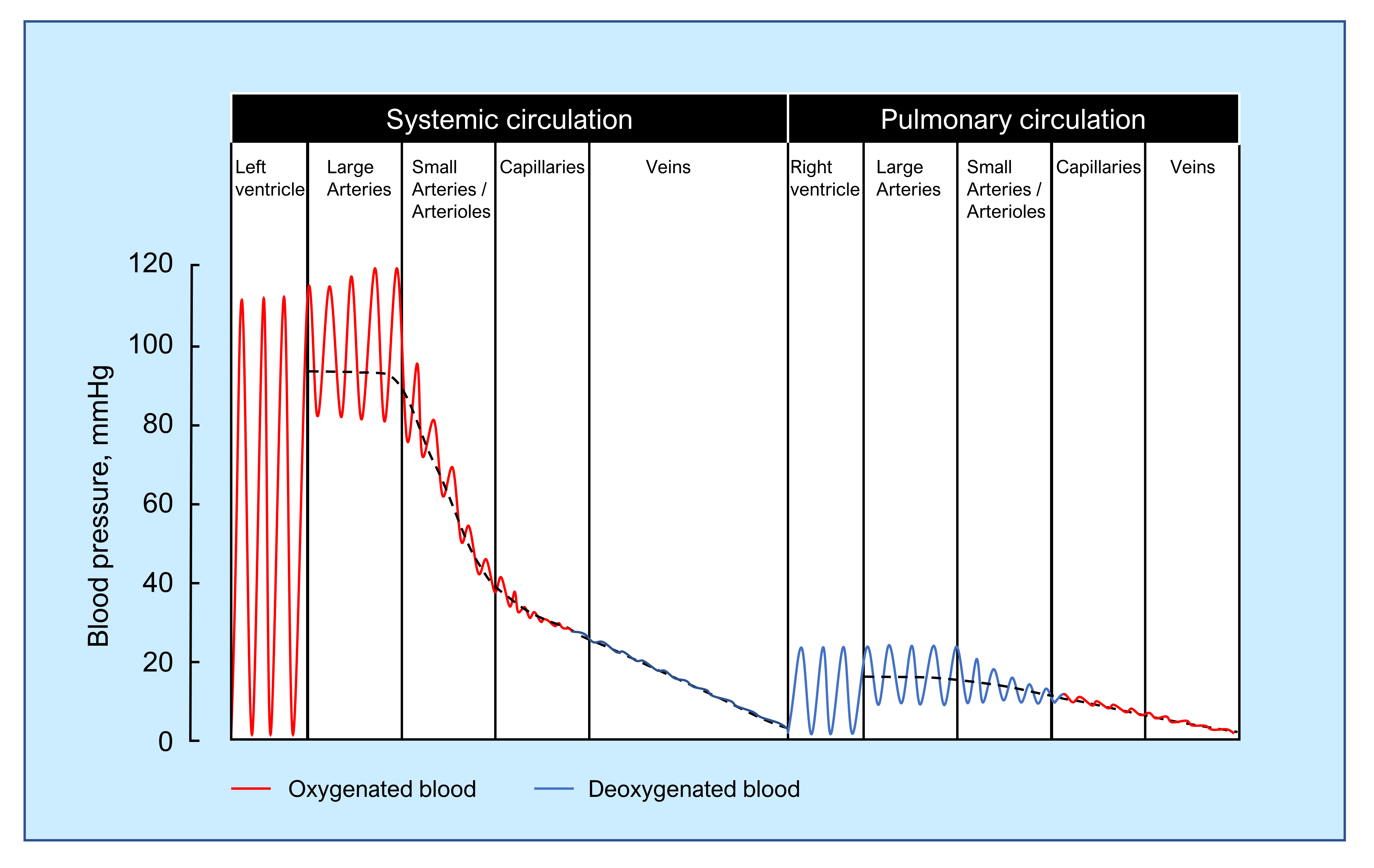
Schematic of pressures in the circulation

During each heartbeat, blood pressure varies between a maximum (systolic) and a minimum (diastolic) pressure. The blood pressure in the circulation is principally due to the pumping action of the heart. However, blood pressure is also regulated by neural regulation from the brain (see Hypertension and the brain), as well as osmotic regulation from the kidney. Differences in mean blood pressure drive the flow of blood around the circulation. The rate of mean blood flow depends on both blood pressure and the resistance to flow presented by the blood vessels. In the absence of hydrostatic effects (e.g. standing), mean blood pressure decreases as the circulating blood moves away from the heart through arteries and capillaries due to viscous losses of energy. Mean blood pressure drops over the whole circulation, although most of the fall occurs along the small arteries and arterioles. Pulsatility also diminishes in the smaller elements of the arterial circulation, although some transmitted pulsatility is observed in capillaries. Gravity affects blood pressure via hydrostatic forces (e.g., during standing), and valves in veins, breathing, and pumping from contraction of skeletal muscles also influence blood pressure, particularly in veins.

=== Hemodynamics ===
A simple view of the hemodynamics of systemic arterial pressure is based around mean arterial pressure (MAP) and pulse pressure. Most influences on blood pressure can be understood in terms of their effect on cardiac output, systemic vascular resistance, or arterial stiffness (the inverse of arterial compliance). Cardiac output is the product of stroke volume and heart rate. Stroke volume is influenced by 1) the end-diastolic volume or filling pressure of the ventricle acting via the Frank–Starling mechanism—this is influenced by blood volume; 2) cardiac contractility; and 3) afterload, the impedance to blood flow presented by the circulation. In the short-term, the greater the blood volume, the higher the cardiac output. This has been proposed as an explanation of the relationship between high dietary salt intake and increased blood pressure; however, responses to increased dietary sodium intake vary between individuals and are highly dependent on autonomic nervous system responses and the renin–angiotensin system, changes in plasma osmolarity may also be important. In the longer-term the relationship between volume and blood pressure is more complex. In simple terms, systemic vascular resistance is mainly determined by the caliber of small arteries and arterioles. The resistance attributable to a blood vessel depends on its radius as described by the Hagen-Poiseuille's equation (resistance∝1/radius^{4}). Hence, the smaller the radius, the higher the resistance. Other physical factors that affect resistance include: vessel length (the longer the vessel, the higher the resistance), blood viscosity (the higher the viscosity, the higher the resistance) and the number of vessels, particularly the smaller numerous, arterioles and capillaries. The presence of a severe arterial stenosis increases resistance to flow, however this increase in resistance rarely increases systemic blood pressure because its contribution to total systemic resistance is small, although it may profoundly decrease downstream flow. Substances called vasoconstrictors reduce the caliber of blood vessels, thereby increasing blood pressure. Vasodilators (such as nitroglycerin) increase the caliber of blood vessels, thereby decreasing arterial pressure. In the longer term a process termed remodeling also contributes to changing the caliber of small blood vessels and influencing resistance and reactivity to vasoactive agents. Reductions in capillary density, termed capillary rarefaction, may also contribute to increased resistance in some circumstances.

In practice, each individual's autonomic nervous system and other systems regulating blood pressure, notably the kidney, respond to and regulate all these factors so that, although the above issues are important, they rarely act in isolation and the actual arterial pressure response of a given individual can vary widely in the short and long term.

=== Pulse pressure ===
A schematic representation of the arterial pressure waveform over one cardiac cycle. The notch in the curve is associated with closing of the aortic valve.

The pulse pressure is the difference between the measured systolic and diastolic pressures,

$$\! P_{\text{pulse}} = P_{\text{sys}} - P_{\text{dias}}.$$

The pulse pressure is a consequence of the pulsatile nature of the cardiac output, i.e. the heartbeat. The magnitude of the pulse pressure is usually attributed to the interaction of the stroke volume of the heart, the compliance (ability to expand) of the arterial system—largely attributable to the aorta and large elastic arteries—and the resistance to flow in the arterial tree.

==== Clinical significance of pulse pressure ====
A healthy pulse pressure is around 40 mmHg. A pulse pressure that is consistently 60 mmHg or greater is likely to be associated with disease, and a pulse pressure of 50 mmHg or more increases the risk of cardiovascular disease as well as other complications such as eye and kidney disease. Pulse pressure is considered low if it is less than 25% of the systolic. (For example, if the systolic pressure is 120 mmHg, then the pulse pressure would be considered low if it is less than 30 mmHg, since 30 is 25% of 120.) A very low pulse pressure can be a symptom of disorders such as congestive heart failure.

Elevated pulse pressure has been found to be a stronger independent predictor of cardiovascular events, especially in older populations, than has systolic, diastolic, or mean arterial pressure. This increased risk exists for both men and women and even when no other cardiovascular risk factors are present. The increased risk also exists even in cases in which diastolic pressure decreases over time while systolic remains steady.

A meta-analysis in 2000 showed that a 10 mmHg increase in pulse pressure was associated with a 20% increased risk of cardiovascular mortality, and a 13% increase in risk for all coronary end points. The study authors also noted that, while risks of cardiovascular end points do increase with higher systolic pressures, at any given systolic blood pressure the risk of major cardiovascular end points increases, rather than decreases, with lower diastolic levels. This suggests that interventions that lower diastolic pressure without also lowering systolic pressure (and thus lowering pulse pressure) could actually be counterproductive. There are no drugs currently approved to lower pulse pressure, although some antihypertensive drugs may modestly lower pulse pressure, while in some cases a drug that lowers overall blood pressure may actually have the counterproductive side effect of raising pulse pressure.

Pulse pressure can both widen or narrow in people with sepsis depending on the degree of hemodynamic compromise. A pulse pressure of over 70 mmHg in sepsis is correlated with an increased chance of survival and a more positive response to IV fluids.

=== Mean arterial pressure ===
Mean arterial pressure (MAP) is the average of blood pressure over a cardiac cycle and is determined by the cardiac output (CO), systemic vascular resistance (SVR), and central venous pressure (CVP):

$$\! \text{MAP} = (\text{CO} \cdot \text{SVR}) + \text{CVP}$$

In practice, the contribution of CVP (which is small) is generally ignored and so

$$\! \text{MAP} = \text{CO} \cdot \text{SVR}$$

MAP is often estimated from measurements of the systolic pressure, $\! P_{\text{sys}}$ and the diastolic pressure, $\! P_{\text{dias}}$ using the equation:

$\! \text{MAP} \approxeq P_{\text{dias}} + k (P_{\text{sys}} - P_{\text{dias}})$

where k = 1/3 although other values for k have been advocated. This estimation is only accurate when the heart rate is around 60 peats per minute.

=== Regulation of blood pressure ===
The endogenous, homeostatic regulation of arterial pressure is not completely understood, but the following mechanisms of regulating arterial pressure have been well-characterized:

- Baroreceptor reflex: Baroreceptors in the high pressure receptor zones detect changes in arterial pressure. These baroreceptors send signals ultimately to the medulla of the brain stem, specifically to the rostral ventrolateral medulla (RVLM). The medulla, by way of the autonomic nervous system, adjusts the mean arterial pressure by altering both the force and speed of the heart's contractions, as well as the systemic vascular resistance. The most important arterial baroreceptors are located in the left and right carotid sinuses and in the aortic arch.
- Renin–angiotensin system (RAS): This system is generally known for its long-term adjustment of arterial pressure. This system allows the kidney to compensate for loss in blood volume or drops in arterial pressure by activating an endogenous vasoconstrictor known as angiotensin II.
- Aldosterone release: This steroid hormone is released from the adrenal cortex in response to activation of the renin-angiotensin system, high serum potassium levels, or elevated adrenocorticotropic hormone (ACTH). Renin converts angiotensinogen to angiotensin I, which is converted by angiotensin converting enzyme to angiotensin II. Angiotensin II then signals to the adrenal cortex to release aldosterone. Aldosterone stimulates sodium retention and potassium excretion by the kidneys and the consequent salt and water retention increases plasma volume, and indirectly, arterial pressure. Aldosterone may also exert direct pressor effects on vascular smooth muscle and central effects on sympathetic nervous system activity.
- Baroreceptors in low pressure receptor zones (mainly in the venae cavae and the pulmonary veins, and in the atria) result in feedback by regulating the secretion of antidiuretic hormone (ADH/vasopressin), renin and aldosterone. The resultant increase in blood volume results in an increased cardiac output by the Frank–Starling law of the heart, in turn increasing arterial blood pressure.

These different mechanisms are not necessarily independent of each other, as indicated by the link between the RAS and aldosterone release. When blood pressure falls many physiological cascades commence in order to return the blood pressure to a more appropriate level.

1. The blood pressure fall is detected by a decrease in blood flow and thus a decrease in glomerular filtration rate (GFR).
2. Decrease in GFR is sensed as a decrease in Na^{+} levels by the macula densa.
3. The macula densa causes an increase in Na^{+} reabsorption, which causes water to follow in via osmosis and leads to an ultimate increase in plasma volume. Further, the macula densa releases adenosine which causes constriction of the afferent arterioles.
4. At the same time, the juxtaglomerular cells sense the decrease in blood pressure and release renin.
5. Renin converts angiotensinogen (inactive form) to angiotensin I (active form).
6. Angiotensin I flows in the bloodstream until it reaches the capillaries of the lungs where angiotensin-converting enzyme (ACE) acts on it to convert it into angiotensin II.
7. Angiotensin II is a vasoconstrictor that will increase blood flow to the heart and subsequently the preload, ultimately increasing the cardiac output.
8. Angiotensin II also causes an increase in the release of aldosterone from the adrenal glands.
9. Aldosterone further increases the Na^{+} and H_{2}O reabsorption in the distal convoluted tubule of the nephron.

The RAS is targeted pharmacologically by ACE inhibitors and angiotensin II receptor antagonists (also known as angiotensin receptor blockers; ARB). The aldosterone system is directly targeted by aldosterone antagonists. The fluid retention may be targeted by diuretics; the antihypertensive effect of diuretics is due to its effect on blood volume. Generally, the baroreceptor reflex is not targeted in hypertension because if blocked, individuals may experience orthostatic hypotension and fainting.

== Measurement ==
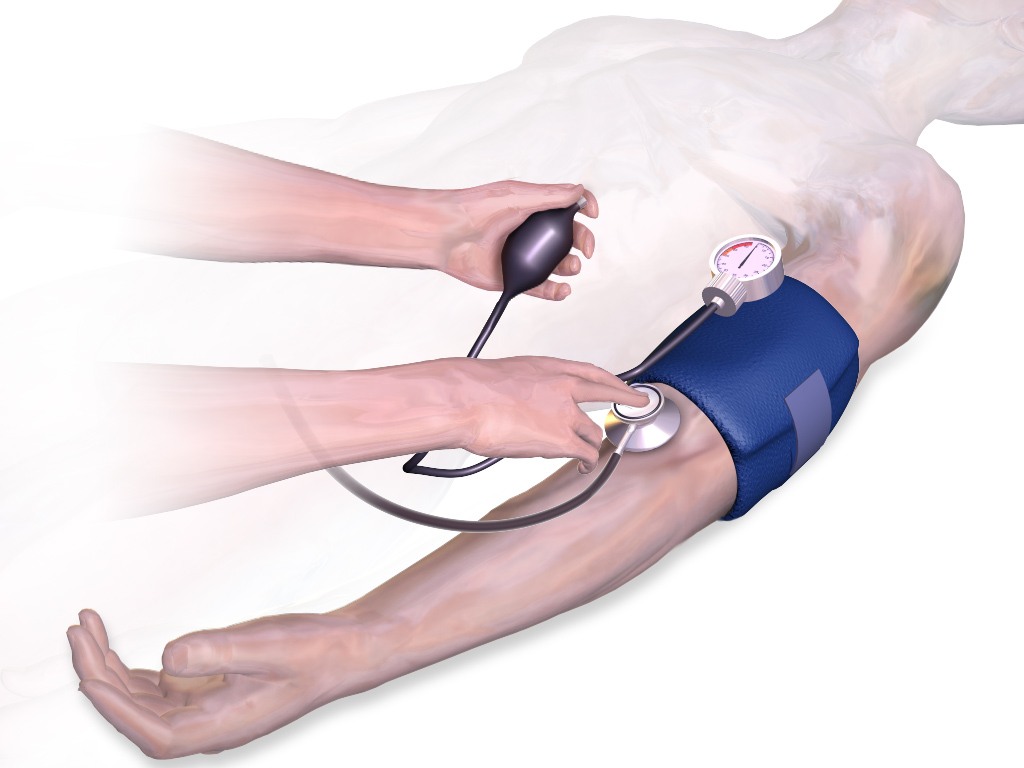
Taking blood pressure with a sphygmomanometer

Measuring systolic and diastolic blood pressure using a mercury sphygmomanometer

Arterial pressure is most commonly measured via a sphygmomanometer, which uses the height of a column of mercury, or an aneroid gauge, to reflect the blood pressure by auscultation. The most common automated blood pressure measurement technique is based on the oscillometric method. Fully automated oscillometric measurement has been available since 1981. This principle has recently been used to measure blood pressure with a smartphone. Measuring pressure invasively, by penetrating the arterial wall to take the measurement, is much less common and usually restricted to a hospital setting. Novel methods to measure blood pressure without penetrating the arterial wall, and without applying any pressure on patient's body are being explored.

In office blood pressure measurement, terminal digit preference is common. According to one study, approximately 40% of recorded measurements ended with the digit zero, whereas "without bias, 10%–20% of measurements are expected to end in zero"

== In animals ==
Blood pressure levels in non-human mammals may vary depending on the species. Heart rate differs markedly, largely depending on the size of the animal (larger animals have slower heart rates). The giraffe has a distinctly high arterial pressure of about 190 mmHg, enabling blood perfusion through the 2 metres (6 ft 7 in)-long neck to the head. In other species subjected to orthostatic blood pressure, such as arboreal snakes, blood pressure is higher than in non-arboreal snakes. A heart near to the head (short heart-to-head distance) and a long tail with tight integument favor blood perfusion to the head.

As in humans, blood pressure in animals differs by age, sex, time of day, and environmental circumstances: measurements made in laboratories or under anesthesia may not be representative of values under free-living conditions. Rats, mice, dogs and rabbits have been used extensively to study the regulation of blood pressure.

Blood pressure and heart rate of various mammals
Species	Blood pressure mmHg		Heart rate beats per minute
Species	Systolic	Diastolic	Heart rate beats per minute
Calves	140	70	75–146
Cats	155	68	100–259
Dogs	161	51	62–170
Goats	140	90	80–120
Guinea-pigs	140	90	240–300
Mice	120	75	580–680
Pigs	169	55	74–116
Rabbits	118	67	205–306
Rats	153	51	305–500
Rhesus monkeys	160	125	180–210
Sheep	140	80	63–210

=== Hypertension in cats and dogs ===
Hypertension in cats and dogs is generally diagnosed if the blood pressure is greater than 150 mmHg (systolic), although sight hounds have higher blood pressures than most other dog breeds; a systolic pressure greater than 180 mmHg is considered abnormal in these dogs.

== See also ==
- History of hypertension
