= Pulse wave velocity =

Measure of arterial stiffness

- Purpose: To measure arterial stiffness

Pulse wave velocity (PWV) is the velocity at which the blood pressure pulse propagates through the circulatory system, usually an artery or a combined length of arteries. PWV is used clinically as a measure of arterial stiffness and can be readily measured non-invasively in humans, with measurement of carotid to femoral PWV (cfPWV) being the recommended method. cfPWV is reproducible, and predicts future cardiovascular events and all-cause mortality independent of conventional cardiovascular risk factors. It has been recognized by the European Society of Hypertension as an indicator of target organ damage and a useful additional test in the investigation of hypertension.

== Relationship with arterial stiffness ==
The theory of the velocity of the transmission of the pulse through the circulation dates back to 1808 with the work of Thomas Young. The relationship between pulse wave velocity (PWV) and arterial wall stiffness can be derived from Newton's second law of motion ($F=ma$) applied to a small fluid element, where the force on the element equals the product of density (the mass per unit volume; $\rho$) and the acceleration. The approach for calculating PWV is similar to the calculation of the speed of sound, ${c_0}$, in a compressible fluid (e.g. air):

$c_0 =\sqrt{\frac{B}{\rho} }$,

where ${B}$ is the bulk modulus and ${\rho}$ is the density of the fluid.

=== The Frank / Bramwell-Hill equation ===
For an incompressible fluid (blood) in a compressible (elastic) tube (e.g. an artery):

$PWV =\sqrt{ \frac{V\cdot dP}{\rho\cdot dV}}$,

where $V$ is volume per unit length and $P$ is pressure. This is the equation derived by Otto Frank, and John Crighton Bramwell and Archibald Hill.

Alternative forms of this equation are:

$PWV=\sqrt{\frac{r\cdot dP}{\rho\cdot 2\cdot dr}}$, or $PWV=\frac{1}{\sqrt{\rho\cdot D}}$,

where $r$ is the radius of the tube and $D$ is distensibility.

=== The Moens–Korteweg equation ===
The Moens–Korteweg equation:

$$\mathrm{PWV} = \sqrt{\dfrac{E_\mathrm{inc} \cdot h}{2 \cdot r \cdot \rho}}$$,

characterises PWV in terms of the incremental elastic modulus ${E_\mathrm{inc}}$ of the vessel wall, the wall thickness $h$, and the radius. It was derived independently by Adriaan Isebree Moens and Diederik Korteweg and is equivalent to the Frank / Bramwell Hill equation:

These equations assume that:

1. there is little or no change in vessel area.
2. there is little or no change in wall thickness.
3. there is little or no change in density (i.e. blood is assumed incompressible).
4. $\operatorname{d}\!v(\operatorname{d}\!r^{-1})\operatorname{d}\!x\cdot \operatorname{d}\!t$ is negligible.

== Variation in the circulatory system ==
Since the wall thickness, radius and incremental elastic modulus vary from blood vessel to blood vessel, PWV will also vary between vessels. Most measurements of PWV represent an average velocity over a path length consisting of several vessels (e.g. from the carotid to the femoral artery).

== Dependence on blood pressure ==
PWV intrinsically varies with blood pressure. PWV increases with pressure for two reasons:

1. Arterial compliance ($\operatorname{d}\!V/\operatorname{d}\!P$) decreases with increasing pressure due to the curvilinear relationship between arterial pressure and volume.
2. Volume ($V$) increases with increasing pressure (the artery dilates), directly increasing PWV.

== Experimental approaches used to measure pulse wave velocity ==
A range of invasive or non-invasive methods can be used to measure PWV. Some general approaches are:

=== Using two simultaneously measured pressure waveforms ===
PWV, by definition, is the distance traveled ($\Delta x$) by the pulse wave divided by the time ($\Delta t$) for the wave to travel that distance:

$\mathrm{PWV} = \dfrac{\Delta x}{\Delta t}$,

in practice this approach is complicated by the existence of reflected waves. It is widely assumed that reflections are minimal during late diastole and early systole. With this assumption, PWV can be measured using the `foot' of the pressure waveform as a fiducial marker from invasive or non-invasive measurements; the transit time corresponds to the delay in arrival of the foot between two locations a known distance apart. Locating the foot of the pressure waveform can be problematic. The advantage of the foot-to-foot PWV measurement is the simplicity of measurement, requiring only two pressure wave forms recorded with invasive catheters, or non-invasively using pulse detection devices applied to the skin at two measurement sites, and a tape measure.

=== Using pressure and volume, or pressure and diameter ===
This is based on the method described by Bramwell & Hill who proposed modifications to the Moens-Kortweg equation. Quoting directly, these modifications were:

"A small rise $\delta P$ in pressure may be shown to cause a small increase, $\delta y=y^2\delta P/(Ec)$, in the radius $y$ of the artery, or a small increase, $\delta V=2\pi y^{3}\delta P / (Ec)$, in its own volume $V$ per unit length. Hence $2y/Ec=\operatorname{d}\!V/(V\operatorname{d}\!P)$"

where $c$ represents the wall thickness (defined as $h$ above), $E$ the elastic modulus, and $y$ the vessel radius (defined as $r$ above). This permits calculation of local PWV in terms of $\sqrt{V\cdot dP/(\rho\cdot dV)}$, or $\sqrt{r\cdot dP/\rho\cdot 2\cdot dr}$, as detailed above, and provides an alternative method of measuring PWV, if pressure and arterial dimensions are measured, for example by ultrasound or magnetic resonance imaging (MRI).

=== Using pressure-flow velocity, pressure-volumetric flow relationships or characteristic impedance ===
The Water hammer equation expressed either in terms of pressure and flow velocity, pressure and volumetric flow, or characteristic impedance can be used to calculate local PWV:

$\mathrm{PWV} = P / \left( v \cdot \rho \right)= P/Q \cdot A/ \rho = Z_\mathrm{c} \cdot A/ \rho$,

where $v$ is velocity, $Q$ is volumetric flow, $Z_\mathrm{c}$ is characteristic impedance and $A$ is the cross-sectional area of the vessel. This approach is only valid when wave reflections are absent or minimal, this is assumed to be the case in early systole.

=== Using diameter-flow velocity relationships ===
A related method to the pressure-flow velocity method uses vessel diameter and flow velocity to determine local PWV. It is also based on the Water hammer equation:

$dP_\pm = \pm\rho \cdot PWV \cdot dv_\pm$,

and since

$dP_+ +dP_- = \frac{2 \cdot \rho \cdot PWV^2}{S} \cdot(dS_+ + dS_-)$,

where $S$ is diameter; then:

$PWV=\frac{S}{2} \cdot \frac {(dv_+ + dv_-)}{(dS_+ + dS_-)}$,

or using the incremental hoop strain, $dS/S = d \ln S$,

PWV can be expressed in terms of $v$ and $S$

$PWV=\pm \frac{1}{2} \cdot \frac{dv_\pm}{d \ln S_\pm}$,

therefore plotting $\ln S$ against $v$ gives a 'lnDU-loop', and the linear portion during early systole, when reflected waves are assumed to be minimal, can be used to calculate PWV.

== Clinical measurement ==
=== Clinical methods ===
Clinically, PWV can be measured in several ways and in different locations. The 'gold standard' for arterial stiffness assessment in clinical practice is cfPWV, and validation guidelines have been proposed. Other measures such as brachial-ankle PWV and cardio-ankle vascular index (CAVI) are also popular. For cfPWV, it is recommended that the arrival time of the pulse wave measured simultaneously at both locations, and the distance travelled by the pulse wave calculated as 80% of the direct distance between the common carotid artery in the neck and the femoral artery in the groin. Numerous devices exist to measure cfPWV; some techniques include:

- use of a transducer to record the time of arrival of the pulse wave at the carotid and femoral arteries.
- use of cuffs placed around the limbs and neck to record the time of arrival of the pulse wave oscillometrically.
- use of Doppler ultrasound or magnetic resonance imaging to record the time of arrival of the pulse wave based on the flow velocity waveform.

Newer devices that employ an arm cuff, fingertip sensors or special weighing scales have been described, but their clinical utility remains to be fully established.

=== Interpretation ===
Current guidelines by the European Society of Hypertension state that a measured PWV larger than 10 m/s can be considered an independent marker of end-organ damage. However, the use of a fixed PWV threshold value is debated, as PWV is dependent on blood pressure. A high pulse wave velocity (PWV) has also been associated with poor lung function.

== See also ==
- Arterial stiffness
- Blood pressure
- Compliance (physiology)
