= Gerrit van Dijk (mathematician) =

Dutch mathematician (1939–2022)

Gerrit van Dijk (14 August 1939, Kampen, Overijssel – 16 April 2022) was a Dutch professor of mathematics and physics. In 2004 he was appointed an Officer of the Order of Orange-Nassau.

== Biography ==
Van Dijk studied mathematics at Utrecht University, where he received his PhD in 1969 with thesis advisor T. A. Springer. As a postdoc, van Dijk worked for the academic year 1969–1970 in Princeton, New Jersey at the Institute for Advanced Study. There he was inspired by Harish-Chandra to study harmonic analysis with the representation theory of Lie groups and prepared the notes for Harish-Chandra's 1969 monograph Harmonic analysis on reductive p-adic groups. From 1970 to 1972 van Dijk was a staff member at Utrecht University. At Leiden University he was appointed lecturer in 1972 and was promoted to professor in 1980. From 1988 to 1992 he was Leiden University's dean of the faculty of mathematics and natural sciences. He was from 1995 to 1997 he was the director of Leiden University's Lorenz Center and from 1997 to 2004 the director of Leiden University's Mathematical Institute. From 2003 to 2004 he directed the Leiden Institute for Advanced Computer Science (LIACS). He was a professor at Leiden University until 2004, when he retired as professor emeritus.

Van Dijk was a visiting professor at various universities in several countries: Germany (Göttingen), France (Nancy), Japan (Fukuoka), Russia (Tambov), and Sweden (Stockholm). He was a member of the Royal Dutch Mathematical Society, the Batavian Society for Experimental Philosophy, and the Koninklijke Hollandsche Maatschappij der Wetenschappen. He supervised 14 doctoral dissertations (some of them with Tom Koornwinder). Van Dijk did research on Lie groups, p-adic representation theory, harmonic analysis, symmetric spaces, homogeneous spaces, Gelfand pairs, and Berezin transforms with generalizations. His collaborators include Vladimir Fedorovich Molchanov, Masato Wakayama, Tom Koornwinder, and Erik G. F. Thomas. Van Dijk's doctoral students include Gerrit Heckman and Eric Opdam (known for Heckman–Opdam polynomials).

Van Dijk did historical research on the life and work of the 19th-century Dutch mathematician Thomas Joannes Stieltjes, as well as other Leiden mathematics professors from the past. This research work resulted in a new issue of Stieltjes's collected works, a portrait gallery in Leiden University's Mathematical Institute, and publication of the book Leidse hoogleraren Wiskunde 1575-1975, which documents the lives of about forty Leiden mathematics professors.

Van Dijk was married and had three children.

== Selected publications ==
- Spherical functions on the þ-adic group PGL. Amsterdam: North-Holland Publishing Company (N.V. Noord-Hollandsche Uitgevers Maatschappij). 1969. LCCN 70458330. (doctoral disseration; summary in Dutch)
- with Mannes Poel: The GL(2n-1,R)-spherical representations of SL(2n,R). Groningen: University of Groningen. 1988.
- as editor with Lambertus A. Pelletier: Thomas Joannes Stieltjes jr., 1856-1894: eredoctor van de Leidse Universiteit. Universiteit Leiden. 1989.
  - Oeuvres complètes = Collected papers / [par] Thomas Jan Stieltjes (reissue of the Oeuvres completes by Stieltjes (with a concise biography and commentaries by Gerrit van Dijk) published by Springer. Berlin/New York. 1993 LCCN 93-9944
- Dat was afgesproken (That was agreed). Universiteit Leiden. 2004. (emeritus farewell speech in Dutch)
- Geloof in de wiskunde: over de getallen van Fibonacci in kunst en literatuur, hun goddelijke status en een discussie over religie en wiskunde (Faith in mathematics: on the Fibonacci numbers in art and literature, their divine status, and a discussion on religion and mathematics). Haarlem: Koninklijke Hollandsche Maatschappij der Wetenschappen (Royal Dutch Society of Mathematics). 2006.
- Introduction to harmonic analysis and generalized Gelfand pairs. Berlin: Walter de Gruyter. 2009. ISBN 978-3-11-022019-3.
- as editor with Masato Wakayama: Casimir force, Casimir operators, and the Riemann hypothesis : mathematics for innovation in industry and science. Berlin; New York: De Gruyter. 2010. ISBN 978-3110226126. LCCN 2010031030.
- Leidse Hoogleraren Wiskunde 1575-1975 (PDF). Universiteit Leiden. 2011. (in Dutch)
- Distribution theory: convolution, Fourier transform, and Laplace transform. Berlin: De Gruyter. 2013. ISBN 978-3110295917. LCCN 2012554713.
