= Moens =

Moens is a Dutch patronymic surname meaning "son of "Mo(e)n", a short form of Simon particularly common in East Flanders.

People with this name include

- Adriaan Isebree Moens (1846–1891), Dutch physician and physiologist
  - Moens–Korteweg equation, biomechanic equation derived by Adriaan Isebree
- Alex Moens (born 1959), Canadian political scientist
- Cecilia Moens, American developmental biologist
- Georges Moens de Fernig (1899–1978), Belgian government minister
- Jean-Baptiste Moens (1833–1908), Belgian philatelist, first dealer in stamps for collectors
- Marc Moens (born 1959), Belgian sprint canoeist
- Oscar Moens (born 1973), Dutch football goalkeeper
- Petronella Moens (1762–1843), Dutch writer, editor and feminist
- Roger Moens (born 1930), Belgian middle-distance runner
- Wies Moens (1898–1982), Belgian literary historian, poet and pamphleteer

== Moëns ==
- William John Charles Möens (1833–1904), English writer and antiquarian

== See also ==
- Moen (surname)
- Moons and Moonen, Dutch surnames of the same origin
