= Korteweg =

Korteweg may refer to:

- Diederik Korteweg, a Dutch mathematician
- 9685 Korteweg, an asteroid named after Diederik Korteweg

== See also ==
- Korteweg–De Vries equation
