= KDVI =

KDVI may refer to:

- KDVI (FM), a radio station (89.9 FM) licensed to Devil's Lake, North Dakota, United States
- a KDE based document viewer, see Okular
- KdVI, Korteweg-de Vries Institute for Mathematics
