= Auscultatory gap =

Medical sign

An auscultatory gap, also known as the silent gap, is a period of diminished or absent Korotkoff sounds during the manual measurement of blood pressure. It is associated with peripheral blood flow caused by changes in the pulse wave. The improper interpretation of this gap may lead to blood pressure monitoring errors, such as an underestimation of systolic blood pressure and/or an overestimation of diastolic blood pressure. To correct for an auscultatory gap, the radial pulse should be monitored by palpation. It is therefore recommended to palpate and auscultate when manually recording a patient's blood pressure. Typically, the blood pressure obtained via palpation is around 10 mmHg lower than the pressure obtained via auscultation. In general, the examiner can avoid being confused by an auscultatory gap by always inflating a blood pressure cuff to 20–40 mmHg higher than the pressure required to occlude the brachial pulse.

== Cause ==
There is evidence that auscultatory gaps are related to carotid atherosclerosis, and to increased arterial stiffness in hypertensive patients. This appears to be independent of age. Another cause is believed to be venous stasis within the limb that is being used for the measurement. Although these observations need to be confirmed prospectively, they suggest that auscultatory gaps may have prognostic relevance.

== History ==
Auscultatory gap was first officially noted in 1918.
