= Eliete Bouskela =

Brazilian physician, researcher

- Education: Federal University of Rio de Janeiro; University of Washington
- Known for: Microcirculation
- Scientific career
- Workplaces: Rio de Janeiro State University; Lund University

Eliete Bouskela (born February 15, 1950) is a Brazilian physician, researcher and professor at the Rio de Janeiro State University. She works on cardiovascular physiology

== Early life and education ==
Eliete Bouskela was born in Uberlândia, February 15, 1950. She dreamed of becoming a chemist or a criminologist. Bouskela started working at the Institute of Biophysics Carlos Chagas Filho, where she worked on the Langendorff heart preparation. She studied medicine at the Federal University of Rio de Janeiro, graduating in 1973. She remained there for her graduate studies, earning a master's degree in biophysics 1975.

== Career and research ==
Bouskela moved to the United States in 1975, where she worked as a research associate at the University of Washington, based at the Mayo Clinic. She earned her PhD in physiology from the University of Washington in 1978.

Bouskela was appointed an associate professor at Rio de Janeiro State University in 1977, and was made a full professor at the Rio de Janeiro State University in 1999. At Rio de Janeiro State University she founded the Laboratory of Microcirculation Research. She was appointed to Lund University as an associate professor in 1987. Here she studies microvascular and endothelial dysfunction. She designed quantitative in vivo investigation of the microcirculation in humans and animals in Brazil. She used a bat wing, demonstrating a longitudinal distensibility gradient.

In 2013, Bouskela was appointed as President of the Superior Council of the Foundation for Research Support of the State of Rio de Janeiro Carlos Chagas Filho (FAPERJ). She was the first woman to work in the technology directorate, and the first to be elected President of FAPERJ. She is on the editorial board of Medical Express.

== Awards and honours ==
- She was the fifth woman member of the Brazilian Academy of Sciences.
- In 2008, she was the first Latin American woman to be elected a member of the Académie Nationale de Médecine.
