= Isla Mackenzie =

British physician and pharmacologist

Isla Mackenzie FRSE FRCP (Edin) FBPhS FBIHS

Academic background
- Education: University of Cambridge (PhD); University of Aberdeen (MBChB)

Academic work
- Discipline: Physician
- Sub-discipline: Cardiovascular medicine
- Institutions: University of Dundee

Isla Mackenzie is a British physician, pharmacologist, and academic. She is currently the chair of cardiovascular medicine at the University of Dundee, and she was awarded a Fellowship of the Royal Society of Edinburgh in 2026.

== Education ==
In 1992, Mackenzie attended the University of Aberdeen to study medicine. In 1997, she graduated with a Bachelor of Medicine, Bachelor of Surgery. In 2003, she went to the University of Cambridge to study clinical pharmacology, and was awarded a Doctor of Philosophy in 2006. Later, Mackenzie obtained a postgraduate certificate in medical education.

== Career ==
Mackenzie completed her specialist training in clinical pharmacology, therapeutics, and general internal medicine in Cambridge. From 2000 to 2008, Mackenzie was a clinical lecturer at the Cambridge University Hospitals. In 2009, she joined the University of Dundee as a senior clinical trials physician.

In 2011, Mackenzie was appointed as clinical senior lecturer of cardiovascular medicine. In 2018, she was promoted to clinical professor.

In April 2026, Mackenzie was elected a Fellow of the Royal Society of Edinburgh, in the discipline of clinical sciences. She is also a fellow of the Royal College of Physicians of Edinburgh, British Pharmacological Society, and British and Irish Hypertension Society. In August 2026, Mackenzie was named a Research Delivery Leader by the National Institute for Health and Care Research (NIHR), for her contributions to healthcare research.

Mackenzie is currently the chair of cardiovascular medicine, and associate dean for research at the School of Medicine. She is also an honorary consultant physician for cardiovascular issues at Ninewells Hospital.

== Research ==
Mackenzie's research is focused on cardiovascular disease, clinical pharmacology, and pharmacoepidemiology.

Mackenzie was the lead author for a study into gout medications febuxostat and allopurinol, and its effectiveness for ischaemic heart disease patients. In November 2020, febuxostat showed no increased risk in cardiovascular events, as compared to allopurinol. In October 2022, the results showed that allopurinol was not effective for those patients, as the medication did not "reduce the primary endpoint of non-fatal myocardial infarction, stroke or cardiovascular death". The research was funded by NIHR, and jointly sponsored by NHS Tayside and the University of Dundee.

To date, Mackenzie has authored or co-authored more than 100 publications.

== Selected publications ==
- Wilkinson, Ian B.; Hall, Ian R.; MacCallum, Helen; Mackenzie, Isla S.; McEniery, Carmel M.; van der Arend, Bart J.; Shu, Yae-Eun; MacKay, Laura S.; Webb, David J.; Cockcroft, John R. (1 January 2002). "Pulse-Wave Analysis: Clinical Evaluation of a Noninvasive, Widely Applicable Method for Assessing Endothelial Function". Arteriosclerosis, Thrombosis, and Vascular Biology. 22 (1): 147–152. doi:10.1161/hq0102.101770. eISSN 1524-4636. ISSN 1079-5642. LCCN 95644718. OCLC 31441121. CODEN ATVBFA.
- Mackenzie, Isla S.; McEniery, Carmel M.; Dhakam, Zahid; Brown, Morris J.; Cockcroft, John R.; Wilkinson, Ian B. (1 June 2009). "Comparison of the Effects of Antihypertensive Agents on Central Blood Pressure and Arterial Stiffness in Isolated Systolic Hypertension". Hypertension. 54 (2): 409–413. doi:10.1161/HYPERTENSIONAHA.109.133801. eISSN 1524-4563. ISSN 0194-911X. LCCN 80645000. OCLC 4798824. CODEN HPRTDN.
- Mackenzie, I. S.; Morant, S. V.; Bloomfield, G. A.; MacDonald, T. M.; O'Riordan, J. (1 January 2014). "Incidence and prevalence of multiple sclerosis in the UK 1990-2010: a descriptive study in the General Practice Research Database". Journal of Neurology, Neurosurgery and Psychiatry. 85 (1): 76–84. doi:10.1136/jnnp-2013-305450. eISSN 1468-330X. ISSN 0022-3050. PMC 3888639. PMID 24052635.
- Mackenzie, Isla S.; Rogers, Amy; Poulter, Neil R.; Williams, Bryan; Brown, Morris J.; Webb, David J.; Ford, Ian; Rorie, David A.; Guthrie, Greg; Grieve, J. W. Kerr; Pigazzani, Filippo; Rothwell, Peter M.; Young, Robin; McConnachie, Alex; Struthers, Allan D. (11 October 2022). "Cardiovascular outcomes in adults with hypertension with evening versus morning dosing of usual antihypertensives in the UK (TIME study): a prospective, randomised, open-label, blinded-endpoint clinical trial". The Lancet. 400 (10361): 1417–1425. doi:10.1016/S0140-6736(22)01786-X. eISSN 1474-547X. ISSN 0140-6736. LCCN sf82002015. OCLC 01755507. PMC 9631239. PMID 36240838. CODEN LANCAO.
- Mackenzie, Isla S.; Hawkey, Christopher J.; Ford, Ian; Greenlaw, Nicola; Pigazzani, Filippo; Rogers, Amy; Struthers, Allan D.; Begg, Alan G.; Wei, Li; Avery, Anthony J.; Taggar, Jaspal S.; Walker, Andrew; Duce, Suzanne L.; Barr, Rebecca J.; Dumbleton, Jennifer S. (March 2024). "Allopurinol and cardiovascular outcomes in patients with ischaemic heart disease: the ALL-HEART RCT and economic evaluation". Health Technology Assessment: 1–55. doi:10.3310/ATTM4092. eISSN 2046-4924. ISSN 1366-5278. OCLC 36731562. PMC 11017142. PMID 38551218.
