= Maria van Oisterwijk =

Dutch mystic

Maria van Oisterwijk (died 30 September 1547), also known as Maria van (den) Hout, was a Dutch Catholic mystic.

== Life ==
Maria was probably born near the village of Udenhout in the Duchy of Brabant between 1470 and 1480. She was the daughter of Lenaart Beijens and Peterke van den Hout. In Latin sources, she is Maria de Ligno, a translation of Maria van Hout. According to the Ephemerides ordinis Cartusiensis, a collection of biographies relating to the Cologne Charterhouse, she began living a monastic life without formal vows while still under her parents' roof.

By 1532, Maria was living in the nearby city of Oisterwijk. That year she was invited by the prior of the Cologne Charterhouse, Peter Blomevenna, to settle with her companions in Cologne and be supported by the Charterhouse. She remained in Oisterwijk and eventually became head of a "house of virgins" (maeghdenhuys). Augustinus Wichmans described the community as "free from vows, but not without regular discipline." It was founded in 1539 in a house bought for that purpose by Nicholas van Essche. Its spirituality was Franciscan and it may have joined the Third Order of Saint Francis at some point. It may also have been inspired by the Sisters of the Common Life.

In 1545, Maria and two other virgins, Yda Jordanis and Eva, relocated to Cologne. She considered Blomevenna her spiritual father. She died in Cologne on 30 September 1547 and was buried in the Charterhouse. The Ephemerides describe her as "a second Catherine of Siena".

== Works ==
Three books contain the writings of Maria van Oisterwijk. The Straight Road is an anthology compiled by Gerhard Kalckbrenner and translated by him from late Middle Dutch to early New High German. It was published in 1531. Of its eight treatises, four are by Maria—"The Straight Road", "The Seven Gifts of the Holy Spirit", "A Divine Text on Poverty of Spirit" and "A Meditation Revealed by God". In addition, it includes fifteen of her letters. The addressees are mostly anonymized, but Blomevenna and Kalckbrenner can be identified.

The Paradise was published in 1532. It too was translated by Kalckbrenner from Dutch into German. A Dutch back translation was printed at 's-Hertogenbosch in 1535. Along with her contributions to The Straight Road, it may have been written in Udenhout. Her third work, Nine Rungs of Simplicity, was written during her time in Cologne. It was never published and was intended only for Kalckbrenner's personal use. Only extracts quoted in German by Kalckbrenner survive.

A Middle English spiritual exercise based on the Five Holy Wounds is attributed to "Mary Ostrewyck" in the manuscript Harley 494, copied between 1531 and 1535 for Anne Bulkeley.

== Bibliography ==
- Barratt, Alexandra (2008). "Singing from the Same Hymn-Sheet: Two Bridgettine Manuscripts". In Margaret Connolly; Linne R. Mooney (eds.). Design and Distribution of Late Medieval Manuscripts in England. York Medieval Press. pp. 139–159.
- Barratt, Alexandra, ed. (2009). Anne Bulkeley and Her Book: Fashioning Female Piety in Early Tudor England. Brepols.
- Barratt, Alexandra, ed. (2010) [1992]. Women's Writing in Middle English: An Annotated Anthology (2nd ed.). Routledge.
- Franken, Jan; van den Oord, Ad (2012). Oisterwijk een geschiedenis van meer dan 800 jaar (PDF) (in Dutch). Stichting Het Kwartier van Oisterwijk. ISBN 978-90-809127-5-5. Archived from the original (pdf) on 2023-08-25.
- Uyttenhove, Lieve (2022). 'To Draw and Assemble All People unto God': The Spiritual Journey of Maria van Oisterwijk (1470/80–1547). Peeters.
