= Pulse pressure =

Difference between systolic and diastolic blood pressure

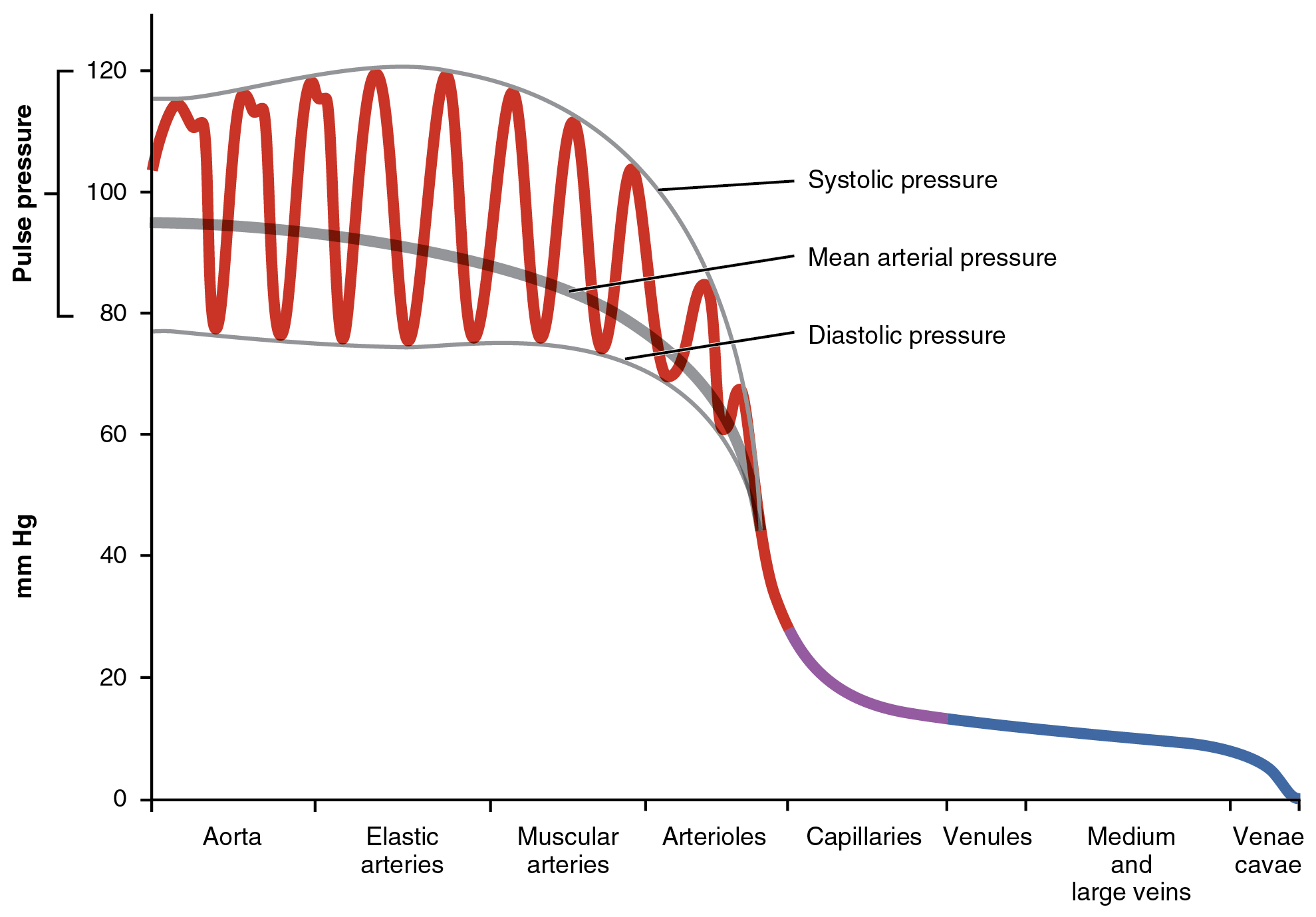
- Pulse pressure variation (PPV) in different arteries and veins

Pulse pressure is the difference between systolic and diastolic blood pressure. It is measured in millimeters of mercury (mmHg). It represents the force that the heart generates each time it contracts. Healthy pulse pressure is around 40 mmHg. A pulse pressure that is consistently 60 mmHg or greater is likely to be associated with disease, and a pulse pressure of 50 mmHg or more increases the risk of cardiovascular disease. Pulse pressure is considered low if it is less than 25% of the systolic. (For example, if the systolic pressure is 120 mmHg, then the pulse pressure would be considered low if it were less than 30 mmHg, since 30 is 25% of 120.) A very low pulse pressure can be a symptom of disorders such as congestive heart failure.

== Calculation ==
Pulse pressure is calculated as the difference between the systolic blood pressure and the diastolic blood pressure.

The systemic pulse pressure is approximately proportional to stroke volume, or the amount of blood ejected from the left ventricle during systole (pump action) and inversely proportional to the compliance (similar to elasticity) of the aorta.

- Systemic pulse pressure (most commonly measured at the brachial artery in the upper arm using a Sphygmomanometer) = P_{systolic} − P_{diastolic}

e.g. normal 120 mmHg – 80 mmHg = 40 mmHg
low: 100 mmHg − 80 mmHg = 20 mmHg
high: 160 mmHg − 80 mmHg = 80 mmHg

- Pulmonary pulse pressure is normally much lower than systemic blood pressure due to the higher compliance of the pulmonary system compared to the arterial circulation. It is measured by right heart catheterization or may be estimated by transthoracic echocardiography. Normal pulmonary artery pressure is 8 mmHg–20 mmHg at rest.

e.g. normal 15mmHg – 8mmHg = 7mmHg
high 25mmHg – 10mmHg = 15mmHg

== Values and variation ==
=== Low (narrow) pulse pressure ===
A pulse pressure is considered abnormally low if it is less than 25% of the systolic value. If the pulse pressure is extremely low, i.e. 25 mmHg or less, it may indicate low stroke volume, as in congestive heart failure.

The most common cause of a low (narrow) pulse pressure is a drop in left ventricular stroke volume. In trauma, a low or narrow pulse pressure suggests significant blood loss.

A narrow pulse pressure is also caused by aortic stenosis. This is due to the decreased stroke volume in aortic stenosis. Other conditions that can cause a narrow pulse pressure include blood loss (due to decreased blood volume), and cardiac tamponade (due to decreased filling time). In the majority of these conditions, systolic pressure decreases, while diastolic pressure remains normal, leading to a narrow pulse pressure.

In the Postural Orthostatic Tachycardia Syndrome it is postulated that declining venous return reduces stroke volume and frequently results in low pulse pressure. In extreme cases, patients experience a drop in pulse pressure to 0 mm Hg upon standing, rendering them practically pulseless while upright. This condition leads to significant morbidity, as many affected individuals struggle to remain standing.

=== High (wide) pulse pressure ===
==== Consistently high ====
A pulse pressure of 50 mmHg or more can increase the risk of heart disease, heart rhythm disorders, stroke and other cardiovascular diseases and events. Higher pulse pressures are also thought to play a role in eye and kidney damage from diseases such as diabetes. There are currently no drugs approved to lower pulse pressure, but some antihypertensive drugs have been shown to modestly lower pulse pressure, while other drugs used for hypertension can actually have the counterproductive side effect of increasing resting pulse pressure.

The aorta has the highest compliance in the arterial system due in part to a relatively greater proportion of elastin fibers versus smooth muscle and collagen. This serves to dampen the pulsatile ejection fraction of the left ventricle, thereby reducing the initial systolic pulse pressure, but slightly raising the subsequent diastolic phase. If the aorta becomes rigid, stiff and inextensible because of disorders, such as arteriosclerosis, atherosclerosis or elastin defects (in connective tissue diseases), the pulse pressure would be higher due to less compliance of the aorta.

In hypertensive patients, a high pulse pressure can often be an indicator of conduit artery stiffness (stiffness of the major arteries). When the arterial walls are stiffer (less compliant), the heart has to beat harder to overcome the resistance from the stiff arteries, resulting in an increased pulse pressure.

Other conditions that can lead to a high pulse pressure include aortic regurgitation, aortic sclerosis, severe iron-deficiency anemia (due to decreased blood viscosity), arteriosclerosis (due to loss of arterial compliance), and hyperthyroidism (due to increased systolic pressure), or arteriovenous malformation, among others. In aortic regurgitation, the aortic valve insufficiency results in the backward flow of blood (regurgitation) that is ejected during systole, and its return to the left ventricle during diastole. This increases the systolic blood pressure, and decreases the diastolic blood pressure, leading to a widened pulse pressure.

A high pulse pressure combined with bradycardia and an irregular breathing pattern is associated with increased intracranial pressure, a condition called Cushing's triad seen in people after head trauma with increased intracranial pressure.

Common causes of widening pulse pressure include:

- Anemia
- Aortic dissection
- Atherosclerosis
- Arteriovenous fistula
- Chronic aortic regurgitation
- Aortic root aneurysm
- Aortic root dilation
- Beri beri
- Distributive shock
- Endocarditis
- Fever
- Heart block
- Increased intracranial pressure
- Patent ductus arteriosus
- Pregnancy
- Thyrotoxicosis

==== From exercise ====
For most individuals, during aerobic exercise, the systolic pressure progressively increases while the diastolic pressure remains about the same, thereby widening the pulse pressure. These pressure changes facilitate an increase in stroke volume and cardiac output at a lower mean arterial pressure, enabling greater aerobic capacity and physical performance. The diastolic drop reflects a reduced systemic vascular resistance of the muscle arterioles in response to the exercise.

== Clinical significance ==
Pulse pressure has implications for both cardiovascular disease as well as many non-cardiovascular diseases. Even in people without other risk factors for cardiovascular disease, a consistently wide pulse pressure remains a significant independent predictor of all-cause, cardiovascular, and, in particular, coronary mortality. There is a positive correlation between high pulse pressure and markers of inflammation, such as c-reactive protein.

=== Cardiovascular disease and pulse pressure ===
Awareness of the effects of pulse pressure on morbidity and mortality is lacking relative to the awareness of the effects of elevated systolic and diastolic blood pressure. However, pulse pressure has consistently been found to be a stronger independent predictor of cardiovascular events, especially in older populations, than has systolic, diastolic, or mean arterial pressure. This increased risk has been observed in both men and women and even when no other cardiovascular risk factors are present. The increased risk also exists even in cases in which high pulse pressure is caused by diastolic pressure decreasing over time while systolic remains steady or even slightly decreases.

A meta-analysis in 2000 showed that a 10 mmHg increase in pulse pressure was associated with a 20% increased risk of cardiovascular mortality, and a 13% increase in risk for all coronary end points. The study authors also noted that, while risks of cardiovascular end points do increase with higher systolic pressures, at any given systolic blood pressure the risk of major cardiovascular end points increases, rather than decreases, with lower diastolic levels. This suggests that interventions that lower diastolic pressure without also lowering systolic pressure (and thus lowering pulse pressure) could actually be counterproductive.

People who simultaneously have a resting diastolic pressure of less than 60 mmHg and a pulse pressure of greater than 60 mmHg have double the risk of subclinical myocardial ischaemia and a risk of stroke that is 5.85 times greater than normal. For such patients, it may be dangerous to target a peripheral systolic pressure below 120 mmHg due to the fact that this could cause the diastolic blood pressure in the cerebral cortex in the brain to become so low that perfusion (blood flow) is insufficient, leading to white matter lesions. Nearly all coronary perfusion and more than half of cerebral perfusion occurs during diastole, thus a diastolic pressure that is too low can cause harm to both the heart and the brain.

Increased pulse pressure is also a risk factor for the development of atrial fibrillation.

=== Effects of medications on pulse pressure ===
There are no drugs currently approved to lower pulse pressure. Although some anti-hypertensive drugs currently on the market may have the effect of modestly lowering pulse pressure, others may actually have the counterproductive effect of increasing pulse pressure. Among classes of drugs currently on the market, a 2020 review stated that thiazide diuretics and long‐acting nitrates are the two most effective at lowering pulse pressure.

It has been hypothesized that vasopeptidase inhibitors and nitric oxide donors may be useful at lowering pulse pressure in patients with elevated pulse pressure by increasing the distensibility of the large arteries. There is evidence that glyceryl trinitrate, a nitric oxide donor, may be effective at lowering both pulse pressure and overall blood pressure in patients with acute and sub-acute stroke.

A 2001 randomized, placebo-controlled trial of 1,292 males, compared the effects of hydrochlorothiazide (a thiazide diuretic), atenolol (a beta-blocker), captopril (an ACE inhibitor), clonidine (a central α_{2}-agonist), diltiazem (a calcium channel blocker), and prazosin (an α_{1}-blocker) on pulse pressure and found that, after one year of treatment, hydrochlorothiazide was the most effective at lowering pulse pressure, with an average decrease of 8.6 mmHg. Captopril and atenolol were equal as least effective, with an average decrease of 4.1 mmHg. Clonidine (decrease of 6.3 mmHg), diltiazem (decrease of 5.5 mmHg), and prazosin (decrease of 5.0 mmHg) were intermediate.

=== Pulse pressure and sepsis ===
Diastolic blood pressure falls during the early stages of sepsis, causing a widening of pulse pressure. If sepsis becomes severe and hemodynamic compromise advances, the systolic pressure also decreases, causing a narrowing of pulse pressure. A pulse pressure of over 70 mmHg in patients with sepsis is correlated with an increased chance of survival. A widened pulse pressure is also correlated with an increased chance that someone with sepsis will benefit from and respond to IV fluids.

== See also ==
- Cold pressor test
- Prehypertension
- Patent ductus arteriosus
- Windkessel effect
