= Moonen =

Moonen is a Dutch patronymic surname, derived from Moon (Dutch pronunciation: [moːn]), a short form of Simon in Limburg. Among variant forms are Monen, Moons and Moens. Notable people with the surname include:

- Andrew J. Moonen (born 1980), American mercenary
- Matt Moonen (born 1984), American (Maine) politician
- Puck Moonen (born 1996), Dutch racing cyclist
- Rick Moonen (born 1977), American chef

Moons

- Jan Moons (born 1970), Belgian football goalkeeper
- Magdalena Moons (1541–1613), Dutch independence war heroine
- Michèle Moons (born 1951), Belgian astronomer

== See also ==
- Moens, Dutch surname of the same origin
- Mones (disambiguation), sometimes a surname
