= Korotkoff sounds =

Sounds listened for when taking blood pressure

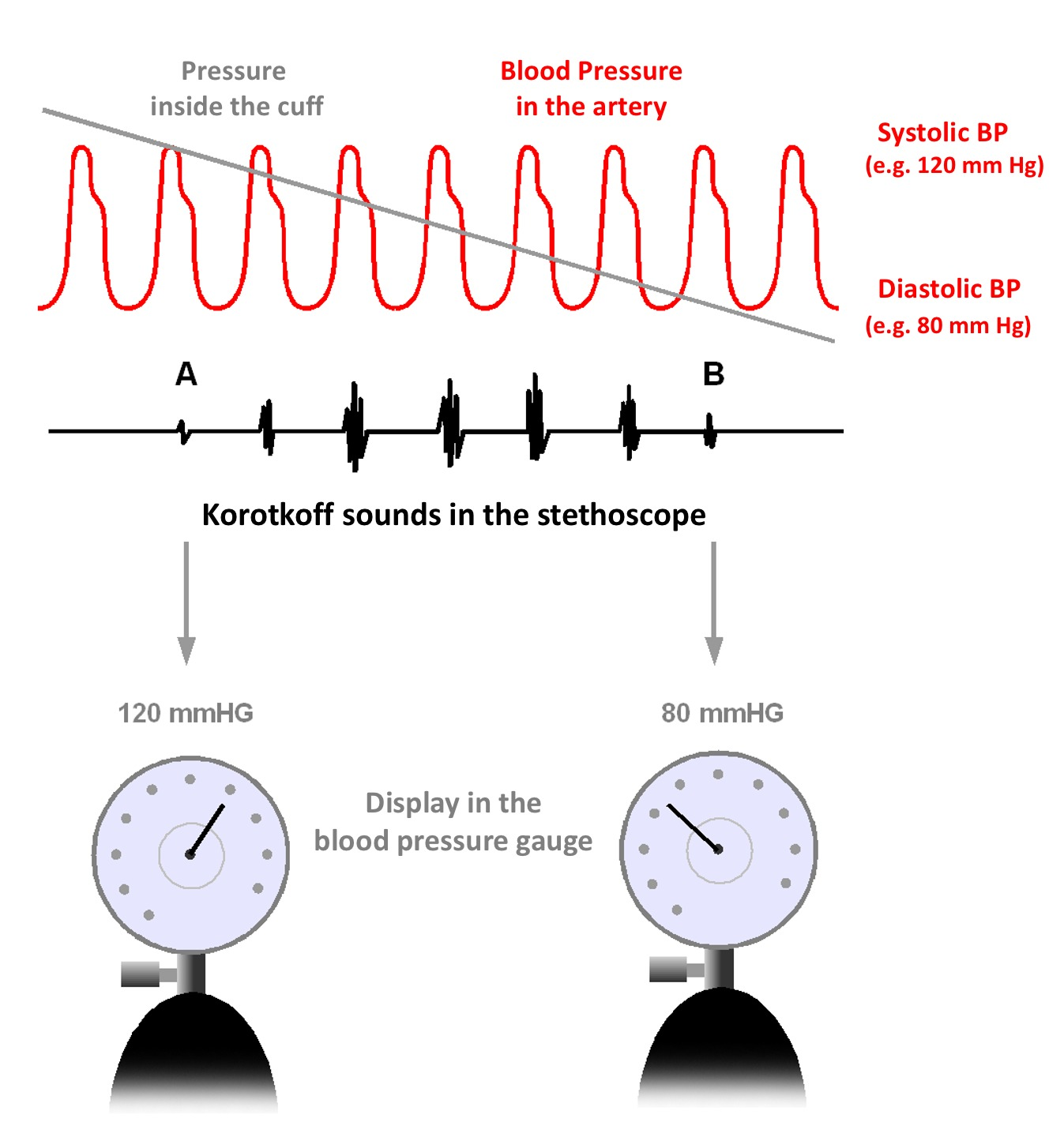
Blood pressure measurement using the auscultatory method based on the (first) Korotkoff-sound

Korotkoff sounds are the sounds that medical personnel listen for when they are taking blood pressure using a non-invasive procedure. They are named after Nikolai Korotkov, a Russian physician who discovered them in 1905, when he was working at the Imperial Medical Academy in St. Petersburg, the Russian Empire.

== Description ==
The sounds heard during the measurement of blood pressure are not the same as the heart sounds heard during chest auscultation that are due to vibrations inside the ventricles associated with the snapping shut of the valves. If a stethoscope is placed over the brachial artery in the antecubital fossa in a normal person (without arterial disease), no sound should be audible. As the heart beats, these pulses are transmitted smoothly via laminar (non-turbulent) blood flow throughout the arteries, and no sound is produced. Similarly, if the cuff of a sphygmomanometer is placed around a patient's upper arm and inflated to a pressure above the patient's systolic blood pressure, there will be no sound audible. This is because the pressure in the cuff is high enough such that it completely occludes the blood flow. This is similar to a flexible tube or pipe with fluid in it that is being pinched shut.

If the pressure is dropped to a level equal to that of the patient's systolic blood pressure, the first Korotkoff sound will be heard. As the pressure in the cuff is the same as the pressure produced by the heart, some blood will be able to pass through the upper arm when the pressure in the artery rises during systole. This blood flows in spurts as the pressure in the artery rises above the pressure in the cuff and then drops back down beyond the cuffed region, resulting in turbulence that produces an audible sound.

As the pressure in the cuff is allowed to fall further, thumping sounds continue to be heard as long as the pressure in the cuff is between the systolic and diastolic pressures, as the arterial pressure keeps on rising above and dropping back below the pressure in the cuff.

Eventually, as the pressure in the cuff drops further, the sounds change in quality, then become muted, and finally disappear altogether. This occurs because, as the pressure in the cuff drops below the diastolic blood pressure, the cuff no longer provides any restriction to blood flow allowing the blood flow to become smooth again with no turbulence and thus produce no further audible sound.

It has been suggested that the mechanism of Korotkoff sounds may not be sound waves at all, but vibrations of the arterial walls that transmits into surrounding tissues, a bit like seismic waves. Others have hypothesized that the Korotkoff sounds are due to cavitation

== The five Korotkoff sounds ==
There are five Korotkoff sounds:

1. Phase I: The first appearance of faint, repetitive, clear tapping sounds which gradually increase in intensity for at least two consecutive beats is the systolic blood pressure.
2. Phase II: A brief period may follow during which the sounds soften and acquire a swishing quality.
3. Phase III: The return of sharper sounds, which become crisper to regain, or even exceed, the intensity of Phase I sounds.
4. Phase IV: The distinct abrupt muffling of sounds, which become soft and blowing in quality.
5. Phase V: The point at which all sounds finally disappear completely is the diastolic pressure.

The second and third Korotkoff sounds have no known clinical significance.

In some patients, sounds may disappear altogether for a short time between Phase II and III, which is referred to as auscultatory gap.

== Systolic and diastolic blood pressure ==
Traditionally, the systolic blood pressure is taken to be the pressure at which the first Korotkoff sound is first heard and the diastolic blood pressure is the pressure at which the fourth Korotkoff sound is just barely audible. However, there has recently been a move towards the use of the fifth Korotkoff sound (i.e. silence) as the diastolic blood pressure, as this has been felt to be more reproducible.

For paediatrics, there has been controversy regarding whether to use auscultation of the fourth or fifth Korotkoff sound as an indicator of diastolic pressure. Current clinical practice guidelines recommend using the fifth Korotkoff sound (but if this is undetectable, using the fourth).

The time average of the first Korotkoff sound represents a reliable pressure marker of systole of the heart. The time average of the fourth Korotkoff sound represents a reliable pressure marker of diastole of the heart.

== See also ==
- Auscultatory gap
- Pulse pressure
