= John Mutsaers =

Dutch footballer

Personal information
- Date of birth: 15 April 1972 (age 54)
- Place of birth: Tilburg, Netherlands
- Position: Forward

Senior career*
Years	Team	Apps	(Gls)
1989–1991	Willem II		
1991–1994	RBC		
1994–2000	AZ		
2000–2003	MVV Maastricht		
- USI'19
- WSC Waalwijk
- * Club domestic league appearances and goals

John Mutsaers (born 15 April 1972) is a Dutch former professional footballer who played as a forward.

== Career ==
Born in Tilburg, he began his career at Willem II. After a spell with RBC, he later played for AZ between 1994 and 2000, scoring 56 goals in 177 appearances in all competitions. He was top scorer of the Eerste Divisie in the 1995–96 season. Although a fan's favourite at AZ, his time there was marred by injury. He had an unsuccessful trial with English club Reading in 1998. He retired from professional football in 2004, after playing with MVV Maastricht. After retiring, he worked as a coach at Willem II, and played amateur football for USI'19 and WSC Waalwijk.

== Personal life ==
He has one son and two daughters. In 2011, he was living in Oisterwijk, where he worked in the building trade.
