= Eric M. Opdam =

Dutch mathematician

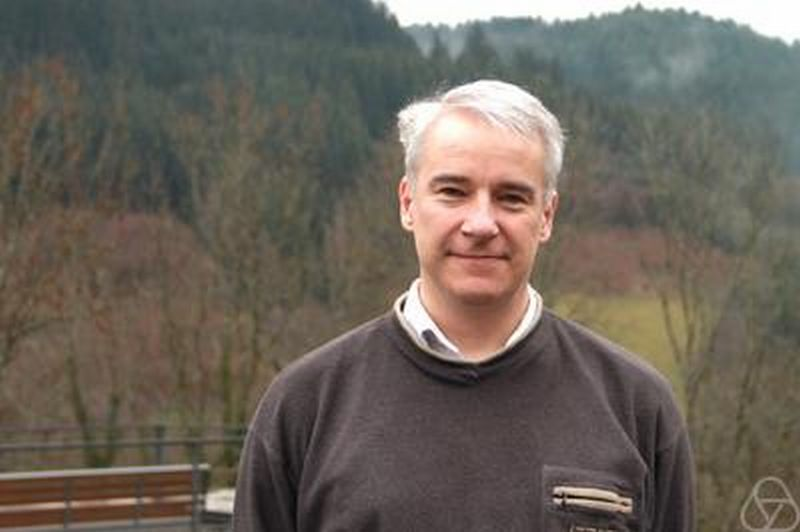
Opdam at Oberwolfach, 2014

Eric Marcus Opdam (born 1960) is a Dutch mathematician, specializing in algebra and harmonic analysis. He is one of the two namesakes of Heckman–Opdam polynomials.

Opdam received his PhD from Leiden University in 1988 under the supervision of Gerrit van Dijk. Opdam is a professor at the University of Amsterdam. He has been at the Korteweg-de Vries Institute for Mathematics (KdVI) since 1999. From 2015 he is the KdVI's director as the successor to Jan Wiegerinck.

Opdam's research deals with analytic aspects of Iwahori–Hecke algebras, with hypergeometric functions associated with Lie algebra root systems (Heckman-Opdam hypergeometric functions), and with Dunkl operators on complex reflection groups.

Opdam was an invited speaker in 2000 with talk Hecke algebras and harmonic analysis at the European Congress of Mathematics in Barcelona. In 2006 he was an invited speaker at International Congress of Mathematicians in Madrid. He was elected a member of the Royal Netherlands Academy of Arts and Sciences in 2012. In 2010 he received an Advanced Grant from the European Research Council (ERC).

He is one of four managing editors of Compositio Mathematica.
