= Heukelom, North Brabant =

Heukelom
- Village
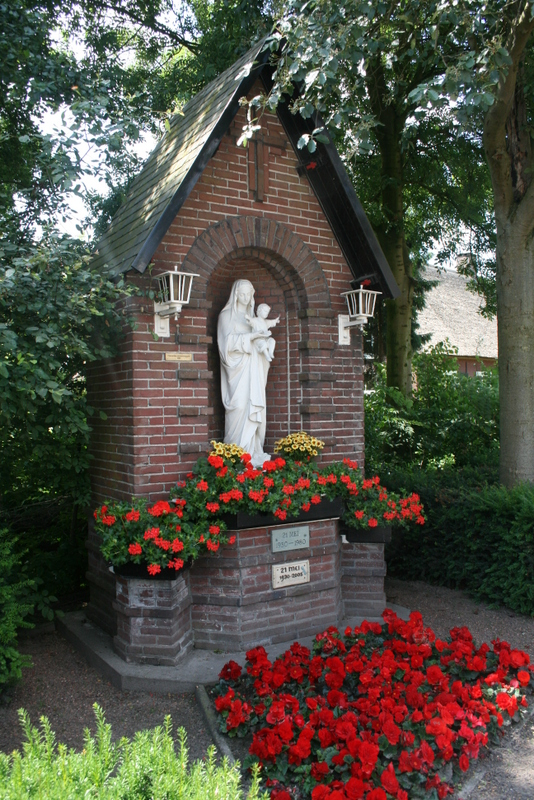
- Mary Chapel

- Location in the province of North Brabant in the Netherlands Heukelom (Netherlands)
- Coordinates: 51°34′46″N 5°9′43″E
- Country: Netherlands
- Province: North Brabant
- Municipality: Oisterwijk

Area
  - Total: 3.52 km^{2} (1.36 sq mi)
- Elevation: 11 m (36 ft)

Population (2021)
  - Total: 280
  - Density: 80/km^{2} (210/sq mi)
- Time zone: UTC+1 (CET)
  - Summer (DST): UTC+2 (CEST)
- Postal code: 5059
- Dialing code: 013

Heukelom is a village in the Dutch province of North Brabant, next to Oisterwijk and Berkel-Enschot.

Heukelom was home to 249 people in 1840. Heukelom used to be part of the municipality of Berkel-Enschot. In 1996, it became part of the municipality of Oisterwijk.
