= Jo Ellis-Monaghan =

American mathematician

Joanna Anthony Ellis-Monaghan is an American mathematician and mathematics educator whose research interests include graph polynomials and topological graph theory. She is a professor of mathematics at the Korteweg-de Vries Institute for Mathematics of the University of Amsterdam.

== Education and career ==
Ellis-Monaghan grew up in Alaska. She graduated from Bennington College in 1984 with a double major in mathematics and studio art, and earned a master's degree in mathematics from the University of Vermont in 1986. After beginning a doctoral program at Dartmouth College, she transferred to the University of North Carolina at Chapel Hill, where she completed her Ph.D. in 1995. Her dissertation, supervised by Jim Stasheff, was A unique, universal graph polynomial and its Hopf algebraic properties, with applications to the Martin polynomial.

She joined the Saint Michael's College faculty in 1992, chaired the department there, and has also held positions at the University of Vermont. In 2020, she became professor of Discrete Mathematics at the University of Amsterdam. From 2010 to 2020, she served as a subject editor of PRIMUS, a journal on the teaching of undergraduate mathematics.

== Bibliography ==
- With Iain Moffat, Ellis-Monaghan is the author of the book Graphs on Surfaces.
