= Prehypertension =

- Other names: High normal blood pressure, borderline hypertensive (BH)
- Specialty: Cardiology

Prehypertension, also known as high normal blood pressure and borderline hypertensive (BH), is a medical classification for cases where a person's blood pressure is elevated above optimal or normal, but not to the level considered hypertension (high blood pressure). Prehypertension is now referred to as "elevated blood pressure" by the American College of Cardiology (ACC) and the American Heart Association (AHA). The ACC/AHA define elevated blood pressure as readings with a systolic pressure from 120 to 129 mm Hg and a diastolic pressure under 80 mm Hg. Readings greater than or equal to 130/80 mm Hg are considered hypertension by ACC/AHA and if greater than or equal to 140/90 mm Hg by ESC/ESH. The European Society of Hypertension defines "high normal blood pressure" as readings with a systolic pressure from 130 to 139 mm Hg and a diastolic pressure 85-89 mm Hg.

Classification of blood pressure is based upon two or more readings at two or more separate occasions, and compared to out-of-office blood pressure readings if possible.

== Signs and symptoms ==
Prehypertension is often asymptomatic (without symptoms) at the time of diagnosis. Only extremely elevated blood pressure (malignant hypertension) can, in rare cases, cause headaches, visual changes, fatigue, or dizziness, but these are nonspecific symptoms which can occur with many other conditions. Thus, blood pressures above normal can go undiagnosed for a long period of time.

== Causes ==
Elevated blood pressure develops gradually over many years usually without a specific identifiable cause. However, possible medical causes, such as medications, kidney disease, adrenal problems or thyroid problems, must first be excluded. High blood pressure that develops over time without a specific cause is considered benign or essential hypertension. Blood pressure also tends to increase as a person ages.

== Management ==
To lower the risk of prehypertension progressing to hypertension, modification of lifestyle or behaviors is necessary.

=== Lifestyle modifications ===
==== Diet ====
A low-sodium, high potassium diet is recommended, along with increasing physical activity to at least thirty minutes a day most days of the week, quitting smoking, reducing alcohol consumption, and maintaining a healthy weight.

Specifically, a diet that is high in fruits and vegetables, whole grains, low in refined grains (e.g., white breads and baked goods made from white flour), low in saturated fats (e.g., fatty cuts of meat or fried foods) and low in sodium (homemade or minimally processed) have been demonstrated through randomized controlled studies to significantly lower blood pressure. These types of diet changes alone can lower blood pressure greater than any single drug therapy. The effects of both diet and sodium reduction work together, meaning the more you improve your diet to include less saturated fat and more fruits and vegetables OR lower your sodium intake significantly below what is typical in industrialized nations, like the United States, the greater the benefit will be seen. Similarly, the better the quality of diet, the more the results will be seen. Significant results have been seen in 30 days.

Foods rich in potassium include banana, papaya, sweet potato, dark leafy greens, avocado, prune juice, tomato juice, oranges, milk, yogurt, dried beans such as navy, pinto and black beans, chickpeas, lentils, beef, pork, fish, nuts and seeds such as pistachio, almonds, pumpkin, flax and sunflower seeds.

==== Exercise ====
Exercise including aerobic exercise, isometric exercise, dynamic resistance training, Tai Chi, Qigong, and Yoga can reduce blood pressure in prehypertensive individuals.

==== Sleep ====
Lack of sleep can increase blood pressure, and longer sleep cycles may reduce blood pressure in prehypertensive individuals.

==== Stress ====
Stress reducing techniques can improve elevated blood pressure.

=== Monitoring ===
Careful monitoring for signs of end-organ damage or progression to hypertension is an important part of the follow-up of patients with prehypertension. Any change in blood pressure classification should be confirmed on at least one subsequent visit.

The major indication for pharmacologic antihypertensive therapy is progression to hypertension. The threshold is lower in patients with diabetes, chronic kidney failure, or cardiovascular disease. The target blood pressure for these conditions is currently less than 120/80 mm Hg.

==== Home monitoring ====
Home monitoring of blood pressure can be used to monitor and track prehypertensive patients. This can help to raise the awareness of the patient and his / her doctor if blood pressure levels rise to hypertensive levels. Home monitoring can help to avoid white coat hypertension which results in blood pressure levels being elevated due to the presence of a doctor or physician in a "white coat". Monitoring at home or work at regular times each day helps to diagnose a patient with prehypertension or hypertension.

The American Heart Association website says, "You may have what's called 'white coat hypertension'; that means your blood pressure goes up when you're at the doctor's surgery. Monitoring at home will help you measure your true blood pressure and can provide your doctor with a log of blood pressure measurements over time. This is helpful in diagnosing and preventing potential health problems."

People using home blood pressure monitoring devices are increasingly also using blood pressure charting software. These charting methods provide print outs for the patient's physician and reminders to check blood pressure.

=== Medication ===
Patients with other health conditions and elevated blood pressure, especially those with diabetes, kidney disease or heart disease, may be advised to take blood pressure medication.

== Prognosis ==
The extent to which prehypertension constitutes a serious health concern remains controversial. Several long-term studies have suggested no significant increase in all-cause mortality over long periods of time for individuals falling within the prehypertensive range. Many studies further indicate a J-shaped relationship between blood pressure and mortality, whereby both very high and very low levels are associated with notable increases in mortality. On the other hand, the National Heart, Lung, and Blood Institute suggests that people with prehypertension are at a higher risk for developing hypertension, or high blood pressure, compared to people with normal blood pressure.

A 2014 meta-analysis concluded that prehypertension increases the risk of stroke, and that even low-range prehypertension significantly increases stroke risk and a 2019 meta-analysis found elevated blood pressure increases the risk of heart attack by 86% and stroke by 66%.

== Epidemiology ==
Data from the 1999 and 2000 National Health and Nutrition Examination Survey (NHANES III) estimated that the prevalence of prehypertension among adults in the United States was approximately 31 percent and decreased to 28 percent in the 2011–2012 National Health and Nutrition Examination Survey. The prevalence was higher among men than women.

=== Risk factors ===
A primary risk factor for prehypertension is being overweight. Other risk factors include a family history of hypertension, a sedentary lifestyle, eating high sodium foods, smoking, and excessive alcohol or caffeine intake.

== See also ==
- Antihypertensive
- Pulse pressure
