= Adriaan Isebree Moens =

Dutch physician and physiologist

- Born: 15 November 1846; Zierikzee
- Died: 24 June 1891 (aged 44); Goes
- Known for: Moens–Korteweg equation
- Scientific career
- Fields: Medicine
- Workplaces: University of Leiden

Adriaan Isebree Moens (15 November 1846 – 24 June 1891) was a Dutch physician and physiologist. He is known for his work on arterial stiffness and the propagation of waves in elastic tubes.

== Life and family ==
Adriaan Isebree Moens was the son of Jan Isebree Moens (1793–1865) and Susanna Cornelia De Kater (1805–1862). He was born on 15 November 1846 in Zierikzee, Netherlands. He married Hermine Gertrude Constance Marie Kolff van Oosterwijk (1848–1878) in 1877 and after her death, Caroline Frederika Wilhelmina Kolff Van Oosterwijk (1854–1937) in 1880. He had three children: Gertrude Hermina Moens, Suzanna Cornelia Moens and Neeltje Isebree Moens. He died on 1891 after a chronic illness.

== Career ==
In 1872 after completing a course in engineering at Ghent University, Moens began to study medicine at Leiden University. He became a pathology assistant in 1874 and in 1875 (probably) he took up an appointment as assistant to Adriaan Heynsius, Professor of Physiology at Leiden. In this role he began his work on arterial wave travel using reservoirs, elastic tubes and air chambers. These studies formed the basis of this doctorate in 1877 and were published in a 145-page monograph, Die Pulscurve, in 1878. The key finding of this work was an empirical relationship that described the velocity of pulse propagation in elastic tubes. Except for a numerical constant this turned out to be identical to the theoretical prediction derived by Diederik Korteweg in 1878 and the relationship is now known as the Moens–Korteweg equation. In 1878 he retired from physiological research and became a medical practitioner in Goes. He was offered the chair of physiology in Leiden in 1885 when Hynsius died, but he turned it down. Willem Einthoven was subsequently appointed to the post.

== See also ==
- Moens–Korteweg equation

== Publications ==
- Moens A.I. Die Pulscurve. Leiden, E.J. Brill 1878.
