= PRIMUS (journal) =

Peer-reviewed academic journal

- Discipline: Mathematics education
- Language: English
- Edited by: Matthew Boelkins

Publication details
- History: 1991–present
- Impact factor: 0.7 (2020)

Standard abbreviations
- ISO 4: PRIMUS

Indexing
- ISSN: 1051-1970 (print); 1935-4053 (web)

Links
- Journal homepage; Community/editorial website

PRIMUS: Problems, Resources, and Issues in Mathematics Undergraduate Studies is a peer-reviewed academic journal covering the teaching of undergraduate mathematics, established in 1991. The journal has been published by Taylor & Francis since March 2007. It is abstracted and indexed in Cambridge Scientific Abstracts, MathEduc, PsycINFO, and Zentralblatt MATH.

PRIMUS is an affiliated journal of the Mathematical Association of America, so all MAA members have access to PRIMUS.

== Editorial Team ==
PRIMUS was started by founding editor-in-chief Brian Winkel in 1991 to address the lack of venues for tertiary mathematics educators to share their pedagogical work. In 2011, Jo Ellis-Monaghan became the second editor-in-chief, with Matt Boelkins serving as associate editor. In 2017, Ellis-Monaghan and Boelkins became co-editors-in-chief.

Currently, Boelkins serves as editor-in-chief, Kathy Weld as associate editor, Brian P Katz as associate and communications editor, and Rachel Schwell as managing editor.
