= Gustav de Vries =

Dutch mathematician (1866–1934)

- Born: 22 January 1866; Amsterdam
- Died: 16 December 1934 (aged 68)
- Education: University of Amsterdam
- Known for: Korteweg–De Vries equation
- Scientific career
- Fields: Mathematics

Gustav de Vries (22 January 1866 – 16 December 1934) was a Dutch mathematician, who is best remembered for his work on the Korteweg–de Vries equation with Diederik Korteweg. He was born on 22 January 1866 in Amsterdam, and studied at the University of Amsterdam with the distinguished physical chemist Johannes van der Waals and with Korteweg. While doing his doctoral research De Vries supported himself by teaching at the Royal Military Academy in Breda (1892-1893) and at the "cadettenschool" in Alkmaar (1893-1894). Under Korteweg's supervision De Vries completed his doctoral dissertation: Bijdrage tot de kennis der lange golven, (Contributions to the knowledge of long waves) Acad. proefschrift, Universiteit van Amsterdam, 1894, 95 pp, Loosjes, Haarlem. The following year Korteweg and De Vries published the research paper On the Change of Form of Long Waves advancing in a Rectangular Canal and on a New Type of Long Stationary Waves, Philosophical Magazine, 5th series, 39, 1895, pp. 422–443. In 1894 De Vries worked as a high school teacher at the "HBS en Handelsschool" in Haarlem, where he remained until his retirement in 1931. He died in Haarlem on 16 December 1934. The Korteweg-de Vries Institute for Mathematics is named after him.

== See also ==
- Cnoidal wave
- Korteweg–de Vries equation
