= Johan Antony Barrau =

Dutch mathematician (1873–1953)

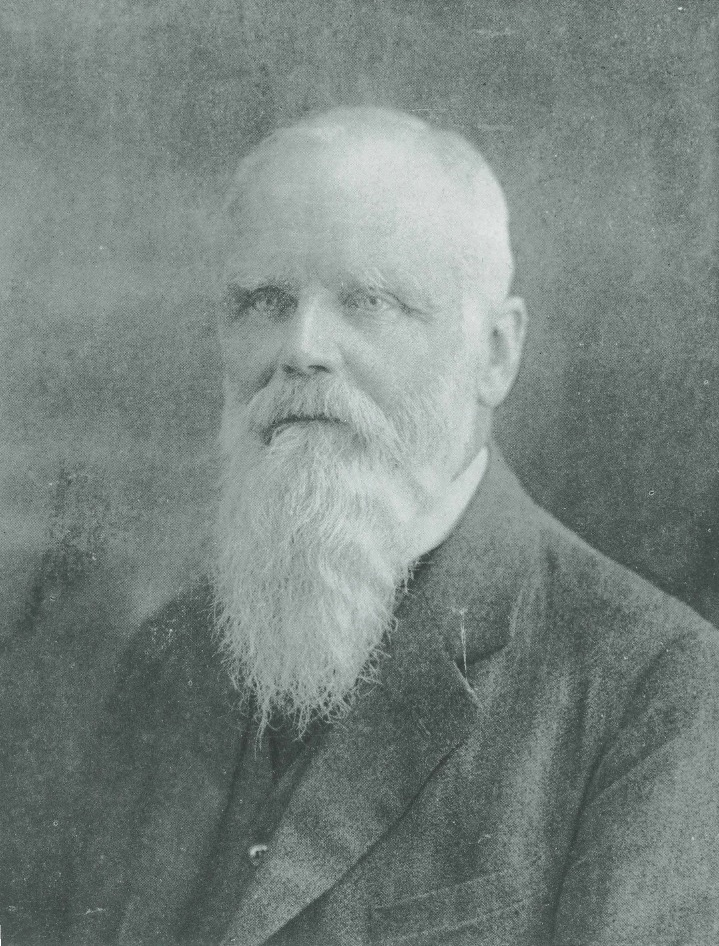
Johan Antony Barrau

Johan Antony Barrau (3 April 1873, Oisterwijk – 8 January 1953, Utrecht) was a Dutch mathematician, specializing in geometry.

Barrau was educated at the Dutch Royal Naval College at Willemsoord and then at the University of Amsterdam. From 1891 to 1898, Barrau was an officer with the Royal Netherlands Navy, later with the Netherlands Marine Corps. However, he left the service and became a mathematics teacher at a Hogere Burgerschool in Dordrecht until 1900, then in Amsterdam. In 1907 he obtained his PhD at the University of Amsterdam under the supervision of Diederik Korteweg. From 1908 to 1913 Barrau was a mathematics professor at the Delft University of Technology. He was a professor of synthetic, analytical and descriptive differential geometry at the University of Groningen from 1913 to 1928. From 1928 until his retirement at age 70, he was a professor at Utrecht University. He received the military service medal consisting of the Expedition Cross with the Atjeh clasp and was named Knight of the Order of the Netherlands Lion. Barrau published a textbook on analytical geometry and various articles in national and international journals.

He was an Invited Speaker of the ICM in 1920 at Strasbourg and in 1924 at Toronto.
