= John R. Cockcroft =

British cardiologist

John R. Cockcroft is Professor of Cardiology at the Heart Research Institute in Cardiff, Wales. Cockcroft also holds the position of Special Professor of Cardiovascular Disease Prevention at the University of Nottingham, and is currently visiting professor at Columbia Presbyterian Hospital in New York City.

His major field of research is arterial stiffness and its effects on the heart, as well as the effects it may have on other conditions, e.g. osteoporosis and metabolic syndrome, in relation to arterial stiffening. Cockcroft has published several papers on the results of his findings.

Cockcroft headed the conference Artery 6, held in 2006 in Athens, giving the welcoming address.
