= Michèle Moons =

Belgian astronomer

Michèle Moons (1951–1998) was a Belgian scientist, leading researches on Celestial Mechanics for the department of mathematics of Facultés Universitaires Notre Dame de la Paix in Namur (Belgium).

She developed an analytical theory of the liberation of the moon in the early 1980s, that is widely used by several centers analyzing the moon's motion. She has also worked on the effects of resonant motion in the minor planet belt. For nearly ten years, she was assistant editor of the journal Celestial Mechanics and Dynamical Astronomy.

Her name has been given to the main-belt asteroid 7805 Moons, discovered in 1960 by Cornelis Johannes van Houten, Ingrid van Houten-Groeneveld and Tom Gehrels at Palomar Observatory.
