= Moens–Korteweg equation =

In biomechanics, the Moens–Korteweg equation models the relationship between wave speed or pulse wave velocity (PWV) and the incremental elastic modulus of the arterial wall or its distensibility. The equation was derived independently by Adriaan Isebree Moens and Diederik Korteweg. It is derived from Newton's second law of motion, using some simplifying assumptions, and reads:

$$PWV = \sqrt{\dfrac{E_\text{inc} \cdot h}{2r\rho}}$$

The Moens–Korteweg equation states that PWV is proportional to the square root of the incremental elastic modulus, (E_{inc}), of the vessel wall given constant ratio of wall thickness, h, to vessel radius, r, and blood density, ρ, assuming that the artery wall is isotropic and experiences isovolumetric change with pulse pressure.
