= Heckman–Opdam polynomials =

Orthogonal polynomials in several variables

In mathematics, Heckman–Opdam polynomials, rarely called Jacobi polynomials, are orthogonal polynomials in several variables associated to root systems. They were introduced by Gert Heckman and Eric M. Opdam.

They generalize Jack polynomials when the root system is of type A. Macdonald polynomials are their q-analogs. Many properties of the Heckman–Opdam polynomials have been studied.
