= Tom H. Koornwinder =

Dutch mathematician

Tom H. Koornwinder (born 19 September 1943, in Rotterdam) is a Dutch mathematician at the Korteweg-de Vries Institute for Mathematics who introduced Koornwinder polynomials.

== See also ==
- Askey–Bateman project
