= Otto Frank (physiologist) =

German physiologist (1865–1944)

- Born: 21 June 1865; Groß-Umstadt, Grand Duchy of Hesse
- Died: 12 November 1944 (aged 79); Munich, Nazi Germany
- Education: University of Glasgow, Heidelberg University, University of Kiel, Leipzig University (MD, 1892), LMU Munich, University of Strasbourg
- Known for: Frank–Starling law of the heart, Windkessel effect
- Scientific career
- Fields: Physiology, cardiology
- Workplaces: University of Giessen, Leipzig University, LMU Munich
- Doctoral advisor: Carl Ludwig

Otto Frank (21 June 1865 – 12 November 1944) was a German medical doctor and physiologist who made contributions to cardiac physiology and cardiology. The Frank–Starling law of the heart is named after him and Ernest Starling.

== Family and early life ==
Friedrich Wilhelm Ferdinand Otto Frank was born in Groß-Umstadt and was the son of Georg Frank (1838–1907), a doctor of medicine and a practicing physician, and Mathilde Lindenborn (1841–1906). Otto Frank was married to Theres Schuster in a Catholic wedding in Munich.

== Training and work ==
Otto Frank studied medicine in Munich and Kiel between 1884 and 1889 (approbation in Munich 1889). During 1889 to 1891 he undertook training in mathematics, chemistry, physics, anatomy and zoology in Heidelberg, Glasgow, Munich and Straßburg. He then worked until 1894 as an assistant to Carl Friedrich Wilhelm Ludwig in the Physiologisches Institut in Leipzig. There in 1892 he completed his doctoral studies (Promotion).

Subsequently, from 1894 Frank worked as an assistant in Carl von Voit's Physiological Institute in Munich where he studied cardiac function using approaches derived from earlier thermodynamic analyses of skeletal muscle contraction. His work on the behaviour of heart muscle was the topic of his post doctoral work. In 1902 he became an Extraordinary Professor and from 1905 to 1908 he undertook further work on this topic before becoming a full professor (Ordinariat). Then he returned to Munich to continue this work. Carl J. Wiggers visited Frank’s laboratory in 1912 and found Frank a ‘‘brilliant analyst, a skillful systematist, a talented mathematician, and a creative thinker...’’, but secretive and difficult to work with. Wiggers returned to the US in the fall of 1912 having ‘smuggled’ copies of some of Frank’s equipment out with him, and published the Wiggers Diagram in the US; arguably one of the most notorious cases of intellectual piracy ever documented. despite this Wiggers and Frank seem to have maintained cordial relations subsequently. Frank appears to have been a demanding teacher and Richard Bing, an Editor of the Journal of Molecular and Cellular Cardiology, who studied with Frank, recalled him as '...a holy terror, hating mediocrity, and many a student bit the dust in the examination in Physiology'. Frank continued to work in Munich until his enforced retirement in 1934 due to his opposition to the Nazi regime.

== Achievements ==
Frank's initial research was related to fat absorption. But in his postdoctoral work (Habilitationsschrift) Frank investigated the isometric and isotonic contractile behaviour of the heart and it is this work that he is best known for. Frank's work on this topic preceded that of Ernest Starling, but both are usually credited with providing the foundations of what is termed the Frank–Starling law of the heart. This law states that "Within physiological limits, the force of contraction is directly proportional to the initial length of the muscle fiber". Frank also undertook important work into the physiological basis of the arterial pulse waveform and may have coined the term essential hypertension in 1911. His work on the Windkessel extended the original ideas of Stephen Hales and provided a sound mathematical framework for this approach. Frank also published on waves in the arterial system but his attempts to produce a theory that incorporated waves and the Windkessel are not considered to have been successful. Frank also did work on the oscillatory characteristics of the auditory apparatus of the ear and the thermodynamics of muscle. He also worked extensively on developing accurate methods to measure blood pressure and other physiological phenomena (e.g. Frank's capsule (Frank-Kapsel), optical Spiegelsphygmograph).

== Selected published work ==
- Zur Dynamik des Herzmuskels, Z Biol 32 (1895) 370
- Die Grundform des arteriellen Pulses, Z Biol 37 (1899) 483-526 (a translation is given by Sagawa K, Lie RK, Schaefer J. J Mol Cell Cardiol 1990; 22: 253-277)
- Kritik der elastischen Manometer, 1903
- Die Registrierung des Pulses durch einen Spiegelsphygmographen, Münchn Med Wschr 42 (1903) 1809–1810
- Die Elastizitat der Blutgefasse. Zeitschrift fur Biologie, 1920; 71: 255-272.
- Die Theorie der Pulswellen. Zeitschrift fur Biologie, 1926; 85: 91-130.
- Schatzung des Schlagvolumens des menschlichen Herzens auf Grund der Wellen und Windkesseltheorie. Zeitschrift fur Biologie 1930; 90: 405-409.

== As subject of publications ==
- Wilhelm Katner: Frank, Otto. In: Histor. Komm. b. d. Bayer. Akad. d. Wiss. (Hrsg.), Neue Deutsche Biographie, 5. Bd., Berlin 1961, pp. 335–336
- I. Fischer (Hrsg.): Biographisches Lexikon der hervorragenden Ärzte der letzten fünfzig Jahre. Berlin 1932, Bd. 1, p. 438
- Kürschners Dtsch. Gelehrtenkalender 6 (1940/41) 378
- A. P. Fishman, D. W. Richards (eds.): Circulation of the blood. New York 1964, pp. 110–113
- A. Hahn: Nekrolog. Jahrb. d. bayer. Akad d. Wiss. 1944–1948, pp. 202–205
- K. E. Rothschuh: Geschichte der Physiologie. Berlin 1953, pp. 184–186
- K. Wezler: Otto Frank. Z Biol 1950; 103: 92–122
- W. Blasius, J. Boylan, K. Kramer (Hrsg.): Begründer der experimentellen Physiologie. Munich 1971
- H.G. Zimmer: Otto Frank and the fascination of high-tech cardiac physiology. Clin Cardiol 2004; 27: 665-666
- H.G. Zimmer. Who Discovered the Frank-Starling Mechanism? News Physiol Sci 2002; 17: 181-84.
- Carlton B. Chapman & Eugene Wasserman. Translators note in relation to a Special Article 'On the Dynamics of Cardiac Muscle' by Otto Frank. American Heart Journal 1959; 58: 282-317.
