= Masato Wakayama =

Japanese mathematician and professor

- 若山正人
- Born: 1955 (age 70–71); Japan
- Education: Tokyo University of Science(BSc); Hiroshima University(PhD)
- Scientific career
- Fields: Mathematics
- Workplaces: NTT Institute for Fundamental Mathematics; Zen University; Kyushu University
- Thesis: Zeta functions of Selberg's type associated with homogeneous vector bundles (1985)
- Doctoral advisor: Kiyosato Okamoto

Masato Wakayama (Japanese: 若山 正人, romanized: Wakayama Masato; born November 1955) is a Japanese mathematician specializing in representation theory, number theory, and mathematical physics. He is the Research Principal of the NTT Institute of Fundamental Mathematics, President of ZEN University and Professor Emeritus at Kyushu University. He worked to improve research collaboration in mathematics between academia and industry and the development of mathematics among young people in Japan.

== Life ==
Masato Wakayama was born in November, 1955. In 1985, he received his Doctor of Science degree in mathematics from Hiroshima University under the supervision of Kiyosato Okamoto.

He worked as an assistant professor at Fukuyama University (1986-1989) and at Tottori University (1989-1994), moving later to Kyushu University, where he stayed until the end of 2019. In addition to the academic position, he held appointments as dean of the faculty of mathematics and graduate school of mathematics (2006-2010) and executive vice president of Kyushu University (2014-2019).

He was one of the founders and first director (2011-2014) of the Institute of Mathematics for Industry of Kyushu University in 2011, a research institute dedicated to promoting mathematical collaboration between academia and industry in Japan.

After concluding his period at Kyushu University, he joined Tokyo University of Science as vice president and professor at the Faculty of Science (2020-2021). Simultaneously, he occupied the position of Principal Fellow of the Center for Research and Development Strategy (CRDS) during 2020-2024, a public think tank of the Japan Science and Technology Agency (JST).

In 2021, he founded the NTT Institute for Fundamental Mathematics (NTT IFM) in NTT R&D. Belonging to the NTT Communication Science Laboratories, the Institute for Fundamental Mathematics is dedicated to basic research in mathematics with topics including algebraic geometry, number theory, representation theory, dynamical systems and graph theory. Currently, he is the head of the institute and Fundamental Mathematics Research Principal.

In 2025, he became the first president of ZEN University, an online university established by the Educational Institute of The Nippon Foundation and DWANGO Co., Ltd. Also, he has served as the president of the Mathematics Certification Institute of Japan.

A conference on the occasion of his 70th birthday was held on October 2025 at Kyushu University.

He has occupied positions in institutions and committees in Japan,:

- Chair, Mathematics Innovation Committee in MEXT (2011-2017).
- Visiting professor, Institute of Science Tokyo (2011-present).
- Senior Advisor/Scientific Advisor, RIKEN Center for Interdisciplinary Theoretical and Mathematical Sciences (iTHEM.S) (2020-present).
- Advisor Board Member, Advanced Institute for Materials Research (AIMR), Tohoku University (2025-present).
- Chair, Mathematical Science (Cross-sectional Issue in JST), Moonshot R&D Program by Cabinet of Japan (2020-present).
- Editor-in-Chief, Mathematics for Industry Book Series of Nature-Springer. (2010-present).
- Editor-in-Chief, International Journal of Mathematics for Industry. (2009-2025).
- Chair and President, Asia Pacific Consortium of Mathematics for Industry (APCMfI) (2014-2021).
- Editor-in-Chief, High School Mathematics Textbook Series "Shinpen" (Japanese: 新興出版社啓林館, romanized: Shinko Shuppansha Keirinkan), (2015–2023).
- Editor-in-Chief, Library of Mathematical Foundations (Japanese: サイエンス社, romanized: saiensu sha), (2017–present).

== Research ==
His contributions are mainly in the areas of representation theory, mathematical physics, and number theory, particularly the theory of zeta functions.

He stated the study of representation theory and invariant theory of the alpha-determinant, a generalization of the determinant interpolating the determinant and the permanent, leading to a notion of wreath determinants for a rectangular matrix with good invariant properties. Other contributions to the theory of determinants are the extension of the Capelli identity to the context of quantum group $GL_q(n)$, and a Pfaffian summation formula in terms of determinant minors for two matrices, which may be considered a Pfaffian version of the Cauchy-Binet formula for determinants.

He also introduced the non-commutative harmonic oscillator, a matrix-valued differential operator generalizing the quantum harmonic oscillator, and studied the arithmetical properties of its spectral zeta functions, obtaining relations with elliptic curves, generalized Apéry numbers and modular forms. He has also contributed to the mathematical study of the spectrum of the quantum Rabi model, a model of quantum interaction. The two models are related via a confluence process of the ordinary differential equation pictures of their eigenvalue problems.
