= Oisterwijk =

- Municipality
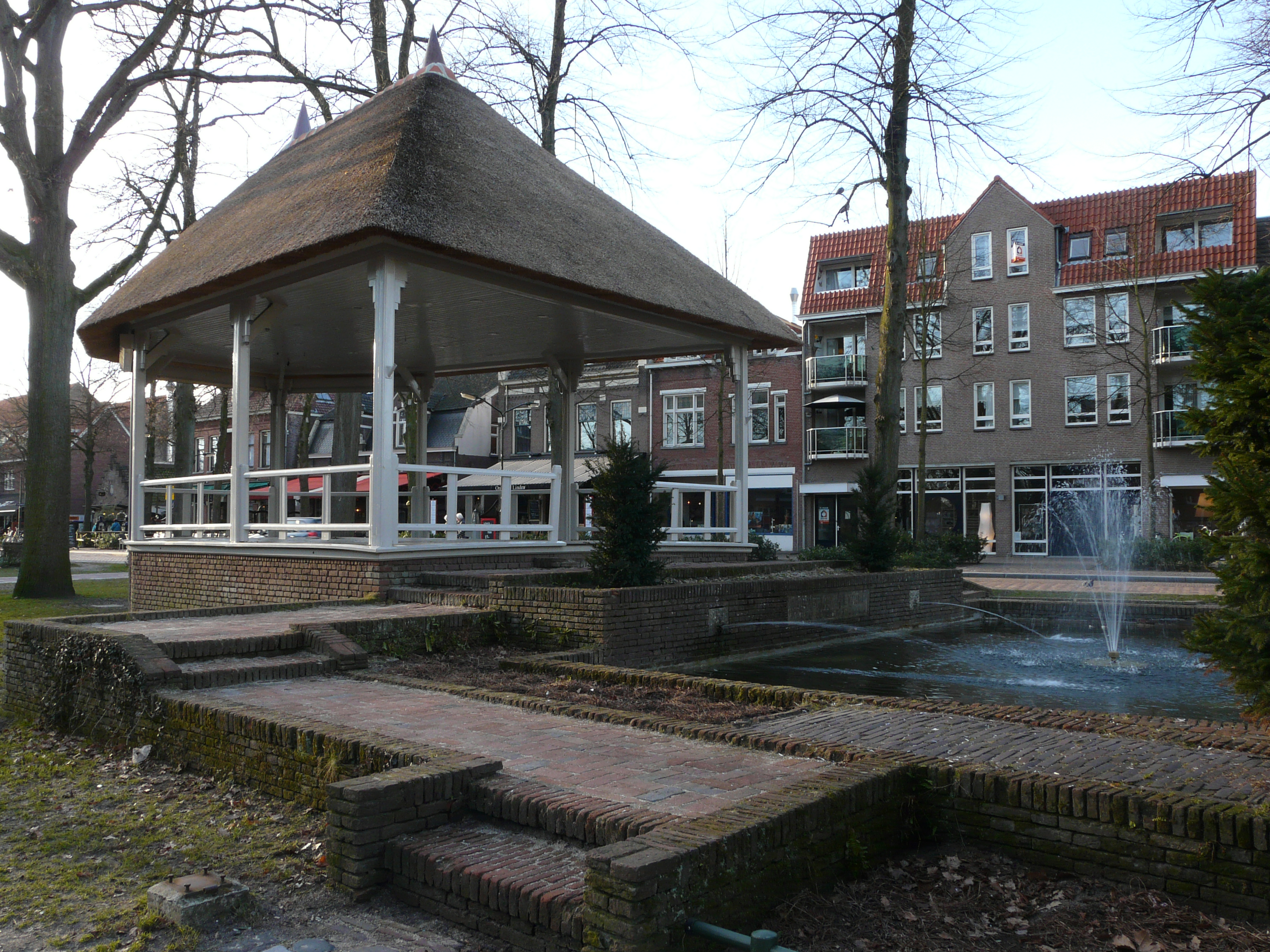
- Gazebo in Oisterwijk

- Flag Coat of arms

- Location in North Brabant
- Coordinates: 51°35′N 5°12′E
- Country: Netherlands
- Province: North Brabant

Government
  - Body: Municipal council
  - Mayor: Hans Janssen (CDA)

Area
  - Total: 65.13 km^{2} (25.15 sq mi)
  - Land: 63.84 km^{2} (24.65 sq mi)
  - Water: 1.29 km^{2} (0.50 sq mi)
- Elevation: 10 m (33 ft)

Population (January 2021)
  - Total: 32,373
  - Density: 507/km^{2} (1,310/sq mi)
- Demonym: Oisterwijker
- Time zone: UTC+1 (CET)
  - Summer (DST): UTC+2 (CEST)
- Postcode: 5059–5066
- Area code: 013
- Website: oisterwijk.nl

Oisterwijk (Dutch pronunciation: [ˈoːstərˌʋɛik]) is a municipality and a city in the south of the Netherlands.

== Population centres ==
- Haaren
- Heukelom
- Moergestel
- Oisterwijk

=== Topography ===
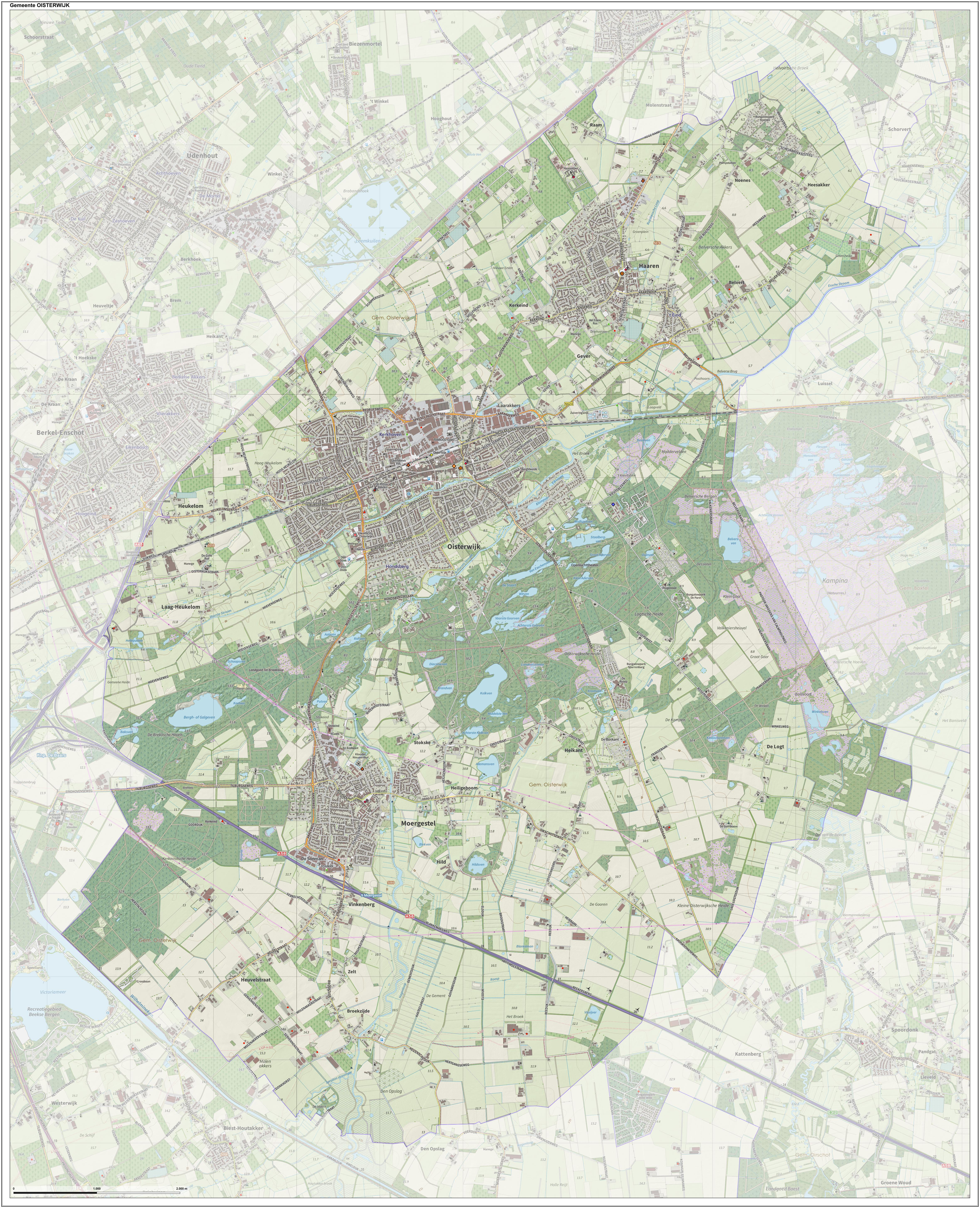

Dutch topographic map of the municipality of Oisterwijk, 2021

== Transport ==
- Railway station: Oisterwijk

== City ==
Oisterwijk received city rights in 1230. Part of the municipality of Oisterwijk includes the 'Oisterwijkse bossen en vennen' (Oisterwijk forests and fens) and the 'Kampina', two nature reserves. The reserves are owned and kept by the 'Vereniging Natuurmonumenten' (Nature Monuments Society).

== Notable people ==
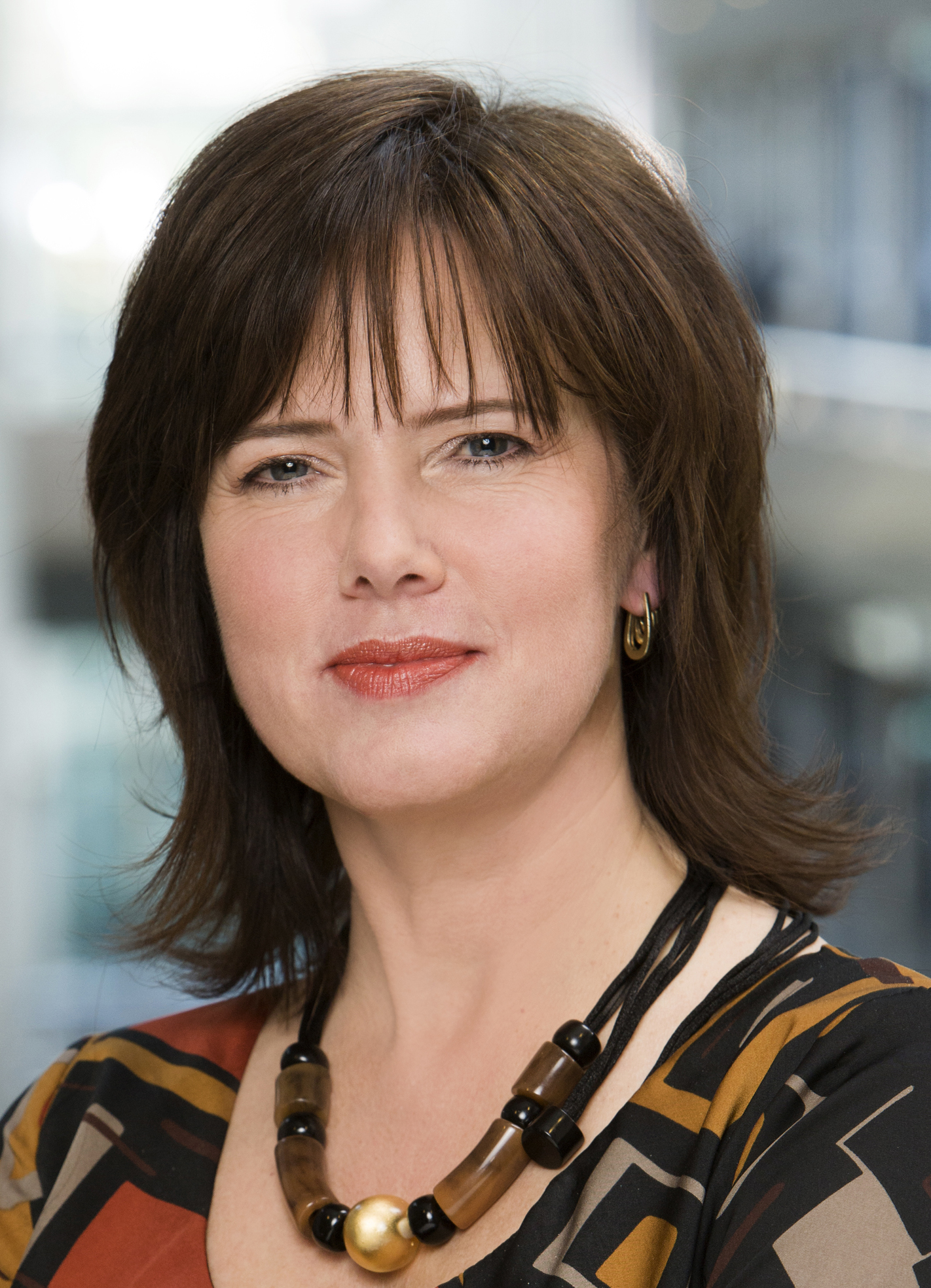
Cora van Nieuwenhuizen, 2018

- Maria van Oisterwijk (died 1547), Dutch Roman Catholic mystic and writer
- Nicolaus van Esch (1507 in Oisterwijk – 1578), Dutch Roman Catholic theologian and mystical writer.
- Adriaan Poirters (1605 in Oisterwijk – 1674), Dutch Jesuit poet and prose writer, active in the Counter Reformation
- Johan Antony Barrau (1873 in Oisterwijk – 1953), Dutch mathematician
- Arnold Meijer (1905 – 1965 in Oisterwijk), Dutch Fascist politician
- Annita van Iersel (born 1948 in Oisterwijk), wife of Paul Keating while he was Prime Minister of Australia (1991-96); later separated and divorced
- Jan Schuurkes (born 1950 in Oisterwijk), Dutch biologist and gastrointestinal researcher
- Cora van Nieuwenhuizen (born 1963 in Ridderkerk), Dutch politician, municipal councillor 1994 to 2006

== Gallery ==
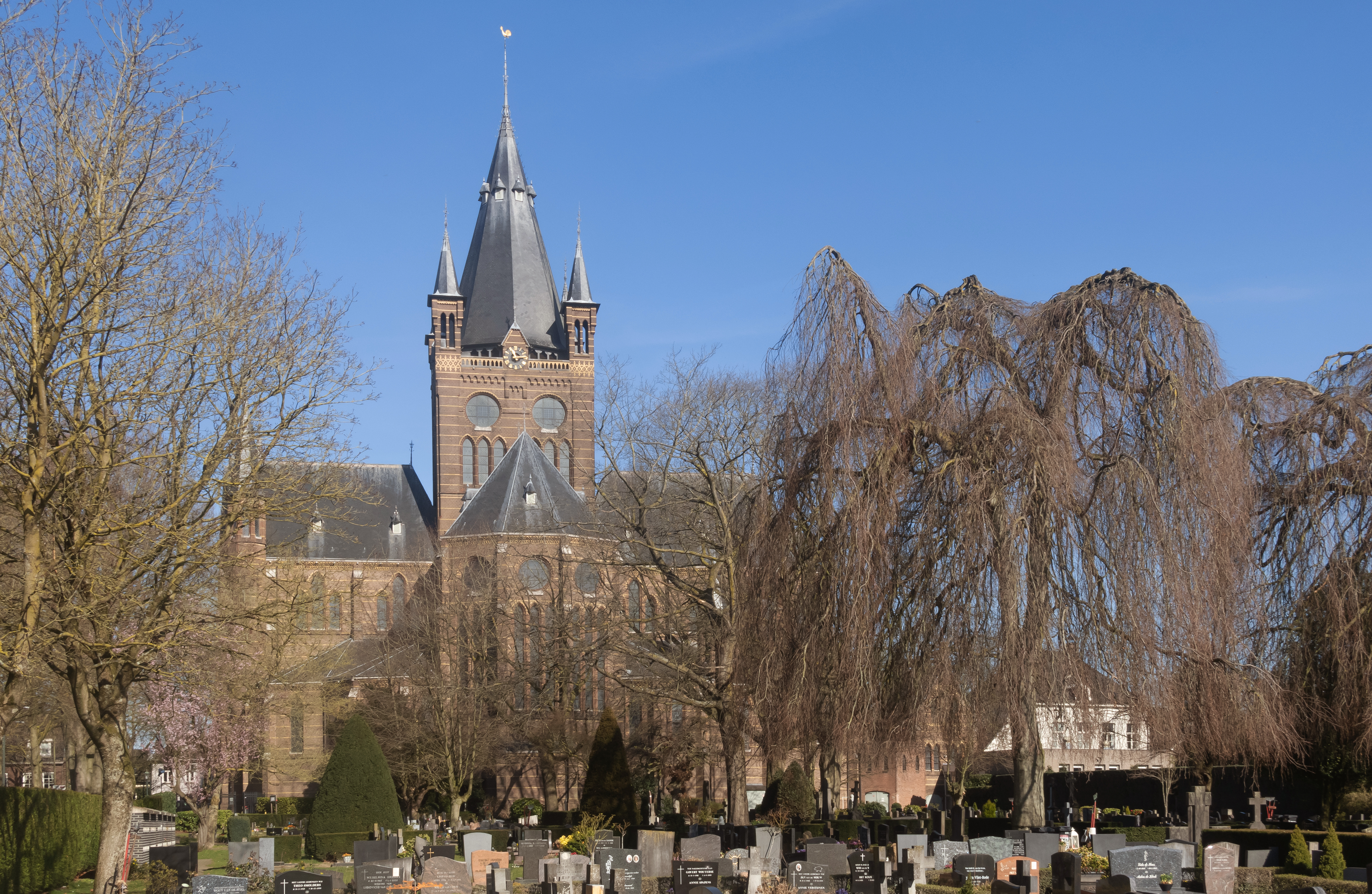
Oisterwijk, church: Sint-Petrus'-Bandenkerk

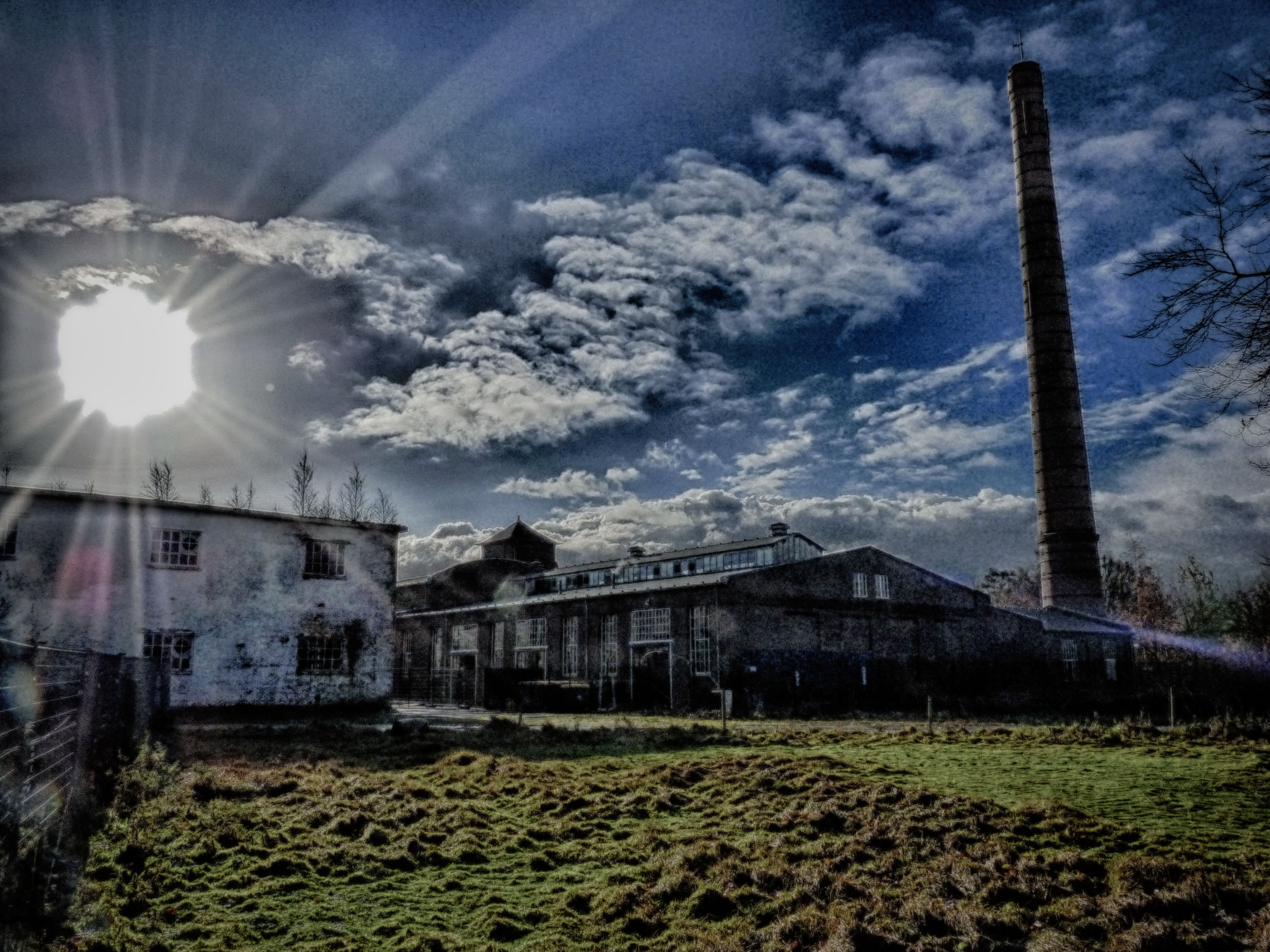
Oisterwijk, Netherlands - panoramio

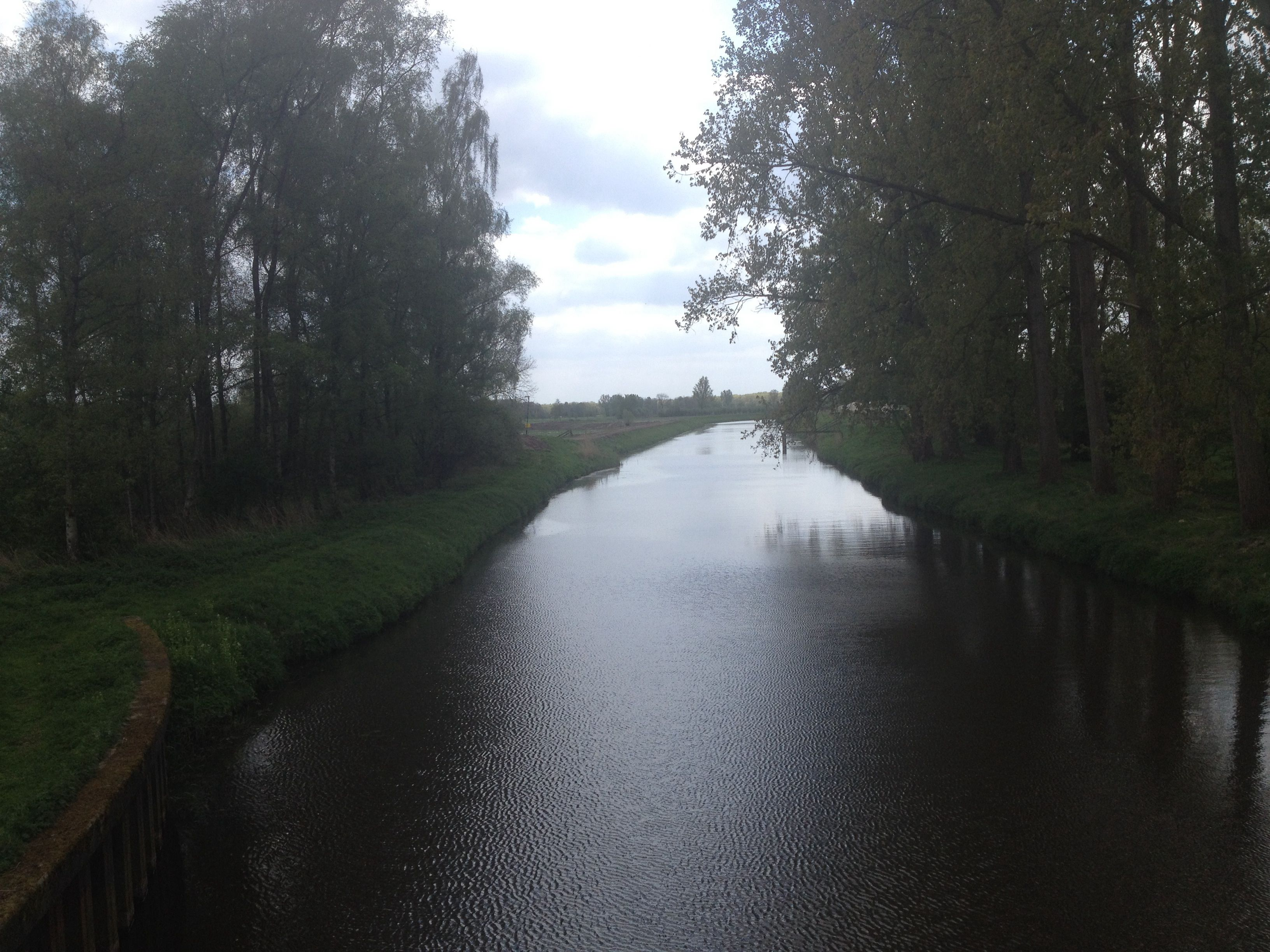
Essche stroom

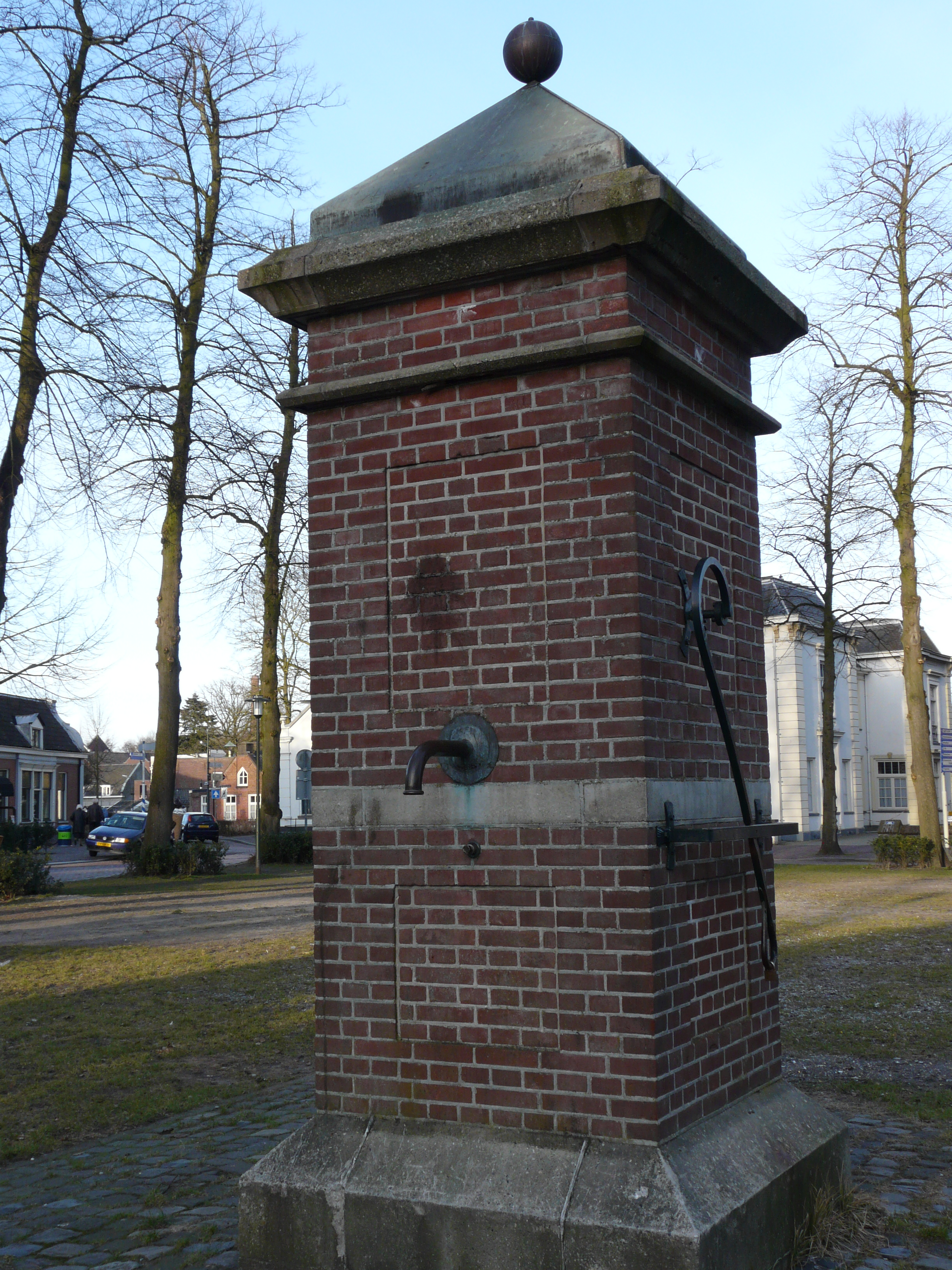
Pomp Oisterwijk

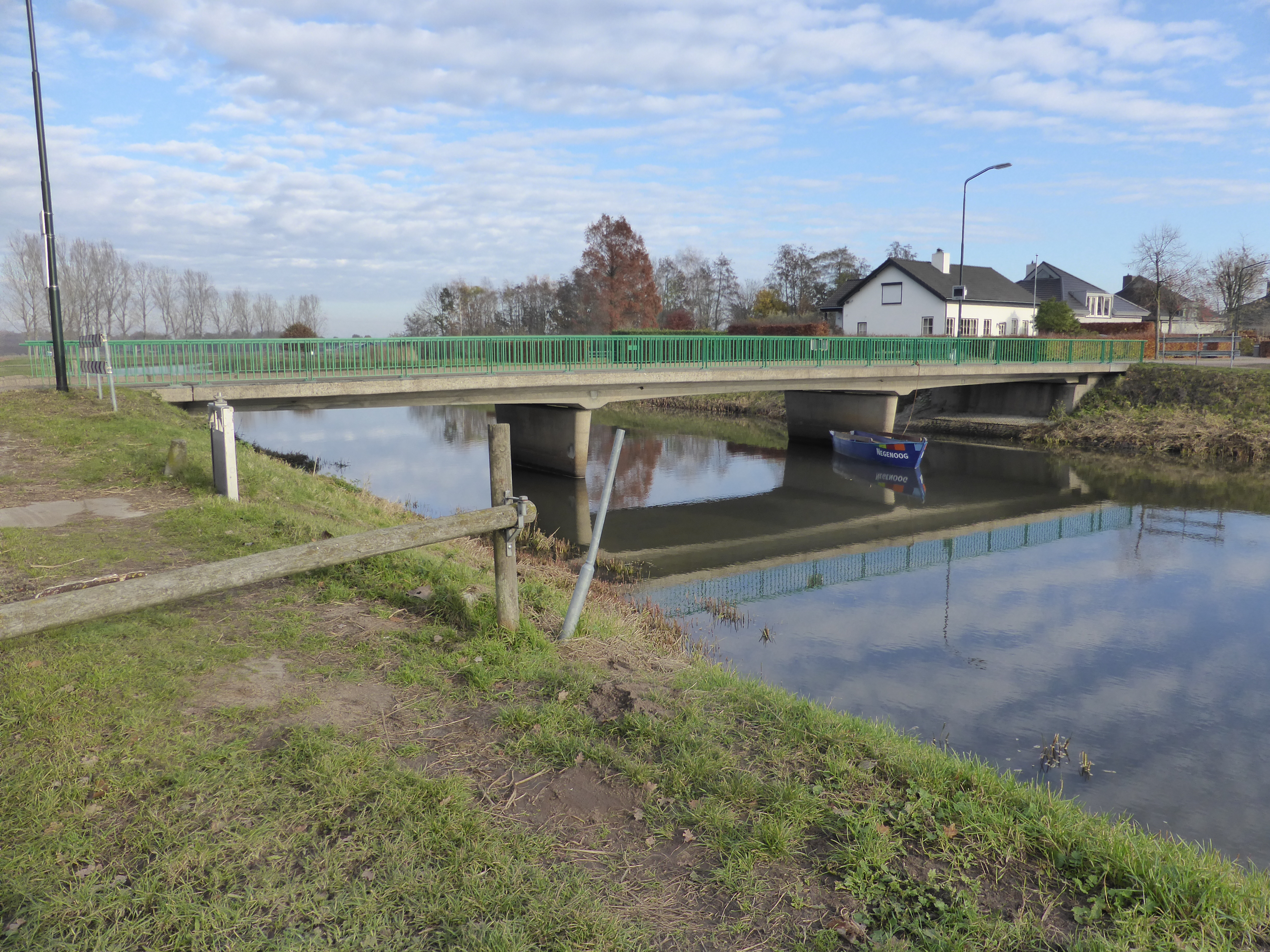
Gasthuisbrug over de Esschestroom in Esch

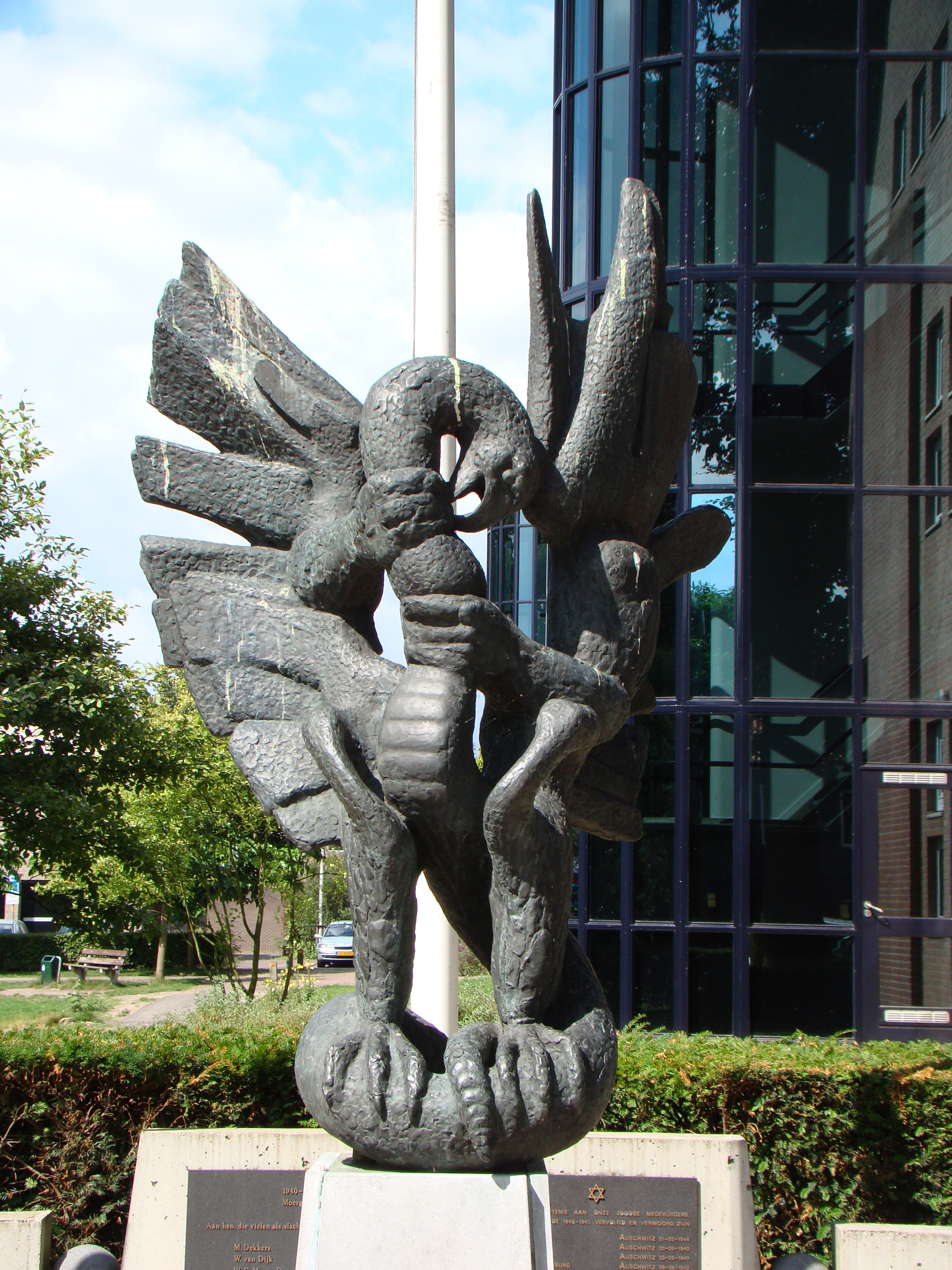
Gevleugelde vrijheid - Oisterwijk
