= Nicolaus van Esch =

Dutch Roman Catholic theologian and mystical writer

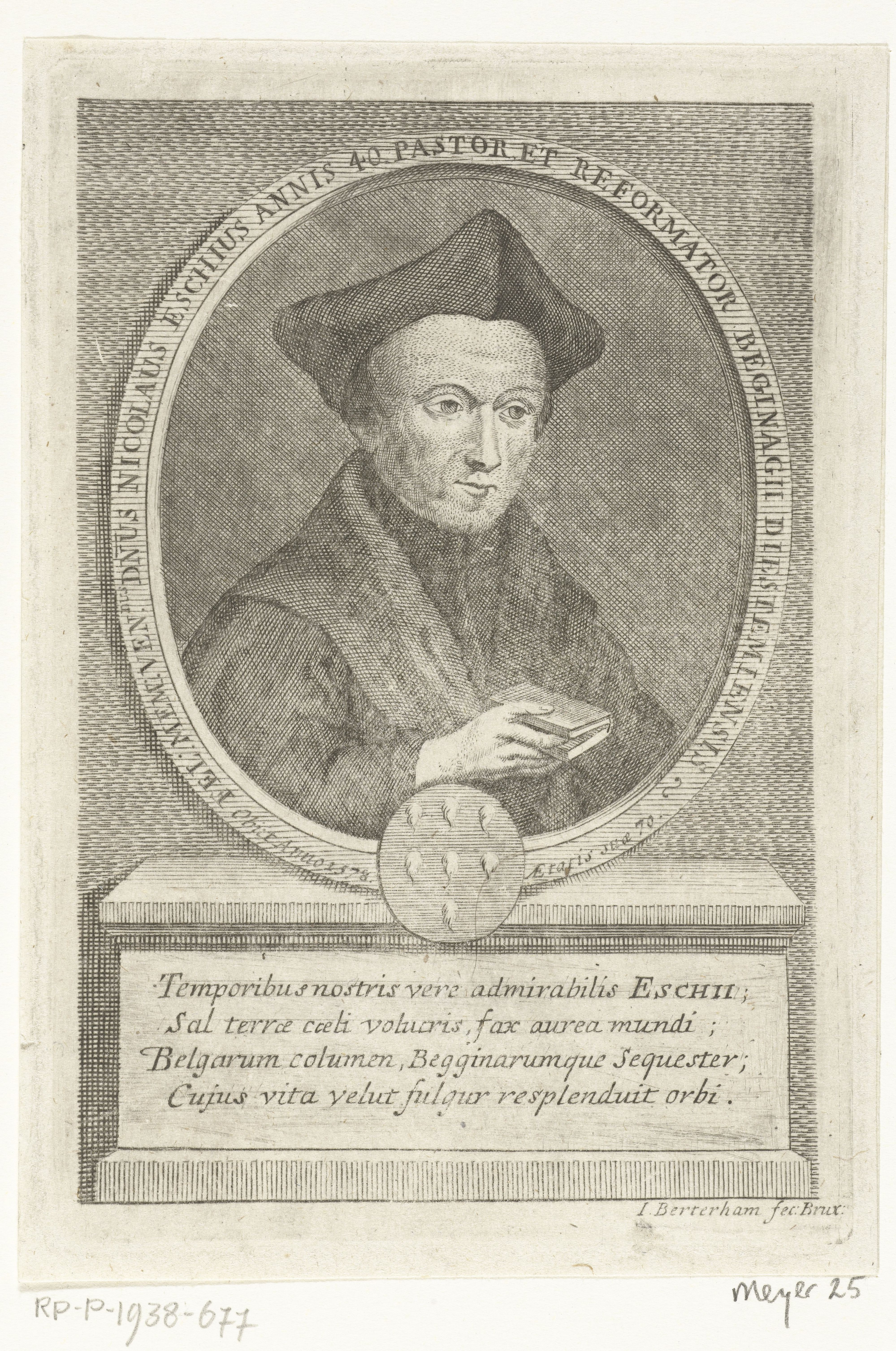
Nicolaus van Esch

Nicolaus van Esch (Eschius) (1507 in Oisterwijk near 's-Hertogenbosch, the Netherlands – 19 July 1578) was a Dutch Roman Catholic theologian and mystical writer.

== Life ==
After finishing his classical studies in the school of the Hieronymites, he studied philosophy, theology, and canon law at the Catholic University of Leuven, but refused to take his doctor's degree. In 1530 he was ordained priest, and then settled in Cologne in order to devote himself to higher studies and the practice of Christian perfection.

There he became the private tutor of a number of young men, mainly university students. Peter Canisius and Lawrence Surius are noted among his pupils. In Cologne, too, he made close friendships with several members of the Carthusian Order, among them Johann Landsberger, Gerhard Homontanus, and Theoderich and Bruno Loher. Though his health did not allow him to become a member of the order, he lived in the monastery, for a time at least, and followed its rule of life as closely as possible.

In 1538 Nicolaus was appointed pastor of the Béguinage at Diest. After a year he surrendered his charge for a time, but took it up again, serving there until his death. After his death he was commonly spoken of as the saintly Father Eschius. He was also instrumental in founding several diocesan seminaries according to the rules laid down by the Council of Trent.

== Works ==
His works include:

- Introductio in vitam introversam, effectively an introduction to a new edition of the Templum animae (Antwerp, 1563 etc.)
- Exercitia theologiae mysticae, seu exercitia quaedam pia, quae compendio hominem ad vitam perfectam instituendam juvare possunt (Antwerp, 1563)
