= Korteweg-de Vries Institute for Mathematics =

Dutch research institute

- Korteweg-de Vries Instituut voor Wiskunde
- Abbreviation: KdVI
- Named after: Diederik Johannes Korteweg and Gustav de Vries
- Type: Research institute
- Location: Amsterdam, Netherlands
- Field: Mathematics
- Director: Jo Ellis-Monaghan
- Parent organization: University of Amsterdam
- Website: kdvi.uva.nl

The Korteweg-de Vries Institute for Mathematics (KdVI) is the institute for mathematical research at the University of Amsterdam. The KdVI is located in Amsterdam at the Amsterdam Science Park.

Robbert Dijkgraaf, Alexander Schrijver, Nicolai Reshetikhin, Jacob Korevaar, Miranda Cheng, Harry Buhrman and Jan van de Craats are notable researchers connected to the institute. The KdVI is an institutional member of the Royal Dutch Mathematical Society and the European Mathematical Society.

== Research ==
Among the core research directions of the KdVI are:

- Algebraic geometry, prof.dr. Lenny Taelman
- Representation theory, Lie theory and algebraic groups, prof.dr. Jasper Stokman and prof.dr. Eric Opdam
- Theoretical physics and mathematical physics, prof.dr. Sergey Shadrin
- Discrete mathematics, algebraic combinatorics and graph theory, prof.dr. Jo Ellis-Monaghan
- Quantum Information, dr. Jeroen Zuiddam
- Pure analysis and dynamical systems, prof.dr. Han Peters
- Numerical analysis and applied analysis, prof.dr. Rob Stevenson
- Mathematical statistics and machine learning, prof.dr. Joris Mooij
- Probability theory and queueing theory, prof.dr. Michel Mandjes
- Operations Research, prof.dr. Sindo Nunez Queija
- History of mathematics, dr. Gerard Alberts
- Didactics, dr. André Heck

The institute is involved in several interdisciplinary research collaborations, including The Amsterdam String Theory Group, the NETWORKS programme and the QuSoft research center for quantum software

== Education ==
Besides its research activities, the KdVI runs the education programmes in mathematics at the University of Amsterdam, namely the bachelor programme Mathematics and the master programmes Mathematics and Stochastics and Financial Mathematics, and jointly organises interdisciplinary double bachelor programmes Mathematics and Physics and Mathematics and Computer Science.

== Name ==
The institute is named after the mathematicians Diederik Johannes Korteweg and Gustav de Vries. Korteweg was professor of mathematics at the University of Amsterdam from 1881 to 1918, and De Vries was Korteweg's student. Together they worked on the Korteweg–de Vries equation.

== Directors ==
Current and former directors of the KdVI
Period	
November 1997 - January 2003	Tom H. Koornwinder
January 2003 - August 2005	Chris Klaassen
August 2005 - August 2015	Jan Wiegerinck
August 2015 - October 2024	Eric Opdam
Since october 2024	Jo Ellis-Monaghan

== See also ==
- Centrum Wiskunde & Informatica
- Institute for Logic, Language and Computation
