= Arterial stiffness =

Loss of elasticity in blood vessels

- Biological system: arteries

Arterial stiffness occurs as a consequence of biological aging, arteriosclerosis and genetic disorders, such as Marfan, Williams, and Ehlers-Danlos syndromes. Inflammation plays a major role in arteriosclerosis and arterial stiffness. Increased arterial stiffness is associated with an increased risk of cardiovascular events such as myocardial infarction, hypertension, heart failure, and stroke. The World Health Organization identified cardiovascular disease as the leading cause of death globally in 2019.

Degenerative changes that occur with age in the walls of large elastic arteries are thought to contribute to increased stiffening over time, including the disruption of lamellar elastin structures within the wall, possibly due to repeated cycles of mechanical stress; inflammation; changes in arterial collagen proteins, partially as a compensatory mechanism against the loss of arterial elastin and partially due to fibrosis; and crosslinking of adjacent collagen fibers by advanced glycation endproducts (AGEs).

== Definition ==
Arterial stiffness is commonly measured as carotid–femoral pulse wave velocity (cfPWV) or brachial–ankle PWV (baPWV). cfPWV is the standard for measuring large artery stiffness in Europe. For baPWV, general cutoff values for cardiovascular risk assessment are <1400 cm/s for low risk, 1400–1800 cm/s for intermediate risk, and >1800 cm/s for high risk. Increased cfPWV and baPWV values predict an increased risk of new-onset hypertension in apparently healthy people.

== Background ==
When the heart contracts it generates a pulse or energy wave that travels through the circulatory system. The speed of travel of this pulse wave (pulse wave velocity, PWV) is related to the stiffness of the arteries. Other terms that are used to describe the mechanical properties of arteries include elastance, or the reciprocal (inverse) of elastance, compliance. The relationship between arterial stiffness and pulse wave velocity was first predicted by Thomas Young in his Croonian Lecture of 1808, and is generally described by the Moens–Korteweg equation or the Bramwell–Hill equation. Typical values of PWV in the aorta range from approximately 5 m/s to over 15 m/s.

Measurement of aortic PWV provides some of the strongest evidence concerning the prognostic significance of large-artery stiffening. Increased aortic PWV has been shown to predict cardiovascular, and in some cases all-cause, mortality in individuals with end stage kidney disease, hypertension, diabetes mellitus and in the general population. A 2024 paper reported that the use of PWV, previously a predominantly research-focused tool, had become a marker of clinical importance. Devices are available that measure arterial stiffness parameters augmentation index and pulse wave velocity, including Complior, CVProfilor, PeriScope, Hanbyul Meditech, Mobil-O-Graph NG, BP Plus (Pulsecor), PulsePen, BPLab Vasotens, Arteriograph, Vascular Explorer, and SphygmoCor.

== Pathophysiological consequences ==
The primary sites of end-target organ damage following an increase in arterial stiffness are the heart, the brain (stroke, white matter hyperintensities (WMHs)), the placenta, and the kidneys (age-related loss of kidney function).

Firstly, stiffened arteries compromise the Windkessel effect of the arteries. The Windkessel effect buffers the pulsatile ejection of blood from the heart converting it into a more steady, even outflow. This function depends on the elasticity of the arteries and stiffened arteries require a greater amount of force to permit them to accommodate the volume of blood ejected from the heart (stroke volume). This increased force requirement equates to an increase in pulse pressure. The increase in pulse pressure may result in increased damage to blood vessels in target organs such as the brain or kidneys. This effect may be exaggerated if the increase in arterial stiffness results in reduced wave reflection and more propagation of the pulsatile pressure into the microcirculation.

An increase in arterial stiffness also increases the load on the heart, since it has to perform more work to maintain the stroke volume. Over time, this increased workload may cause left ventricular hypertrophy and left ventricular remodelling, which can lead to heart failure. The increased workload may also be associated with a higher heart rate, a proportionately longer duration of systole and a comparative reduction of duration of diastole. This decreases the amount of time available for perfusion of cardiac tissue, which largely occurs in diastole.

Arterial stiffness may also affect the time at which pulse wave reflections return to the heart. As the pulse wave travels through the circulation it undergoes reflection at sites where the transmission properties of the arterial tree change (i.e. sites of impedance mismatch). These reflected waves propagate backward towards the heart. The speed of propagation (i.e. PWV) is increased in stiffer arteries and consequently reflected waves will arrive at the heart earlier in systole. This increases the load on the heart in systole. Elevated PWV could represent an important parameter for identifying children with CKD and high cardiovascular risk.

== See also ==
- Compliance (physiology)
- John R. Cockcroft
- Pulse wave velocity
