= Compliance (physiology) =

Ability of a biological organ to distend

Compliance is the ability of a hollow organ (vessel) to distend and increase volume with increasing transmural pressure or the tendency of a hollow organ to resist recoil toward its original dimensions on application of a distending or compressing force. The reciprocal of compliance is elastance, a measure of the tendency of a hollow organ to recoil toward its original dimensions upon removal of a distending or compressing force.

== Blood vessels ==
The terms elastance and compliance are of particular significance in cardiovascular physiology and respiratory physiology. In compliance, an increase in volume occurs in a vessel when the pressure in that vessel is increased. The tendency of the arteries and veins to stretch in response to pressure has a large effect on perfusion and blood pressure. This physically means that blood vessels with a higher compliance deform easier than lower compliance blood vessels under the same pressure and volume conditions. Venous compliance is approximately 30 times larger than arterial compliance. Compliance is calculated using the following equation, where $\Delta V$ is the change in volume (mL), and $\Delta P$ is the change in pressure (mmHg):

$$C =  \frac{ \Delta V}{ \Delta P}$$

Physiologic compliance is generally in agreement with the above and adds $\tfrac{dP}{dt}$ as a common academic physiologic measurement of both pulmonary and cardiac tissues. Adaptation of equations initially applied to rubber and latex allow modeling of the dynamics of pulmonary and cardiac tissue compliance.

Veins have a much higher compliance than arteries (largely due to their thinner walls.) Veins which are abnormally compliant can be associated with edema. Pressure stockings are sometimes used to externally reduce compliance, and thus keep blood from pooling in the legs.

Vasodilation and vasoconstriction are complex phenomena; they are functions not merely of the fluid mechanics of pressure and tissue elasticity but also of active homeostatic regulation with hormones and cell signaling, in which the body produces endogenous vasodilators and vasoconstrictors to modify its vessels' compliance. For example, the muscle tone of the smooth muscle tissue of the tunica media can be adjusted by the renin–angiotensin system. In patients whose endogenous homeostatic regulation is not working well, dozens of pharmaceutical drugs that are also vasoactive can be added. The response of vessels to such vasoactive substances is called vasoactivity (or sometimes vasoreactivity). Vasoactivity can vary between persons because of genetic and epigenetic differences, and it can be impaired by pathosis and by age. This makes the topic of haemodynamic response (including vascular compliance and vascular resistance) a matter of medical and pharmacologic complexity beyond mere hydraulic considerations (which are complex enough by themselves).

The relationship between vascular compliance, pressure, and flow rate is:
$$Q=C\frac{\mathrm{d}P}{\mathrm{d}t}=\mathrm{(flow rate)(cm^3/sec)}$$

=== Arterial compliance ===
The classic definition by MP Spencer and AB Denison of compliance ($C$) is the change in arterial blood volume ($\Delta V$) due to a given change in arterial blood pressure ($\Delta P$). They wrote this in the "Handbook of Physiology" in 1963 in work entitled "Pulsatile Flow in the Vascular System". So, $C=\frac{\Delta V}{\Delta P}$.

Arterial compliance is an index of the elasticity of large arteries such as the thoracic aorta. Arterial compliance is an important cardiovascular risk factor. Compliance diminishes with age and menopause. Arterial compliance is measured by ultrasound as a pressure (carotid artery) and volume (outflow into aorta) relationship.

Compliance, in simple terms, is the degree to which a container experiences pressure or force without disruption. It is used as an indication of arterial stiffness. An increase in the age and also in the systolic blood pressure (SBP) is accompanied with decrease on arterial compliance.

Endothelial dysfunction results in reduced compliance (increased arterial stiffness), especially in the smaller arteries. This is characteristic of patients with hypertension. However, it may be seen in normotensive patients (with normal blood pressure) before the appearance of clinical hypertension. Reduced arterial compliance is also seen in patients with diabetes and also in smokers. It is actually a part of a vicious cycle that further elevates blood pressure, aggravates atherosclerosis (hardening of the arteries), and leads to increased cardiovascular risk. Arterial compliance can be measured by several techniques. Most of them are invasive and are not clinically appropriate. Pulse contour analysis is a non-invasive method that allows easy measurement of arterial elasticity to identify patients at risk for cardiovascular events.

== See also ==
- Cardiovascular System Dynamics Society
- Windkessel effect
