= Diederik Korteweg =

Dutch mathematician (1848–1941)

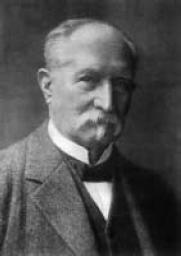
- Diederik Johannes Korteweg
- Born: 31 March 1848; Den Bosch
- Died: 10 May 1941 (aged 93); Amsterdam
- Education: University of Amsterdam
- Known for: Korteweg–de Vries equation, Korteweg stress Moens–Korteweg equation
- Scientific career
- Fields: Mathematics
- Workplaces: University of Amsterdam
- Doctoral advisor: Johannes Diderik van der Waals
- Doctoral students: J. A. Barrau; L. E. J. Brouwer; Gustav de Vries; Gerrit Mannoury; Julius Wolff; Willem Wythoff

Diederik Johannes Korteweg (31 March 1848 – 10 May 1941) was a Dutch mathematician. He is now best remembered for his work on the Korteweg–de Vries equation, together with Gustav de Vries.

== Early life and education ==
Diederik Korteweg's father was a judge in 's-Hertogenbosch, Netherlands. Korteweg received his schooling there, studying at a special academy which prepared students for a military career. However, he decided against a military career and, making the first of his changes of direction, he began his studies at the Polytechnical School of Delft. Korteweg originally intended to become an engineer but, although he maintained an interest in mechanics and other applications of mathematics throughout his life, his love of mathematics made him change direction for the second time when he was not enjoying the technical courses at Delft. He decided to terminate his course and pull out of his studies so that he could concentrate on mathematics. He then enrolled in mathematics and mechanics courses qualifying him to become a high school teacher.

In 1878, Korteweg received a Ph.D. from the University of Amsterdam. His dissertation was titled On the Propagation of Waves in Elastic Tubes. He was the first Ph.D. recipient from that University after it received authority to grant the doctorate.

In 1881, Korteweg joined the University of Amsterdam as Professor of Mathematics, Mechanics and Astronomy. While there he published a notable paper in Philosophical Magazine titled "On the Change of Form of Long Waves . . ". He stepped down as a professor in 1918.

Some of his famous students were Gustav de Vries, Gerrit Mannoury and Luitzen Egbertus Jan Brouwer.

== Honors and societies ==
Korteweg was a member of the Royal Netherlands Academy of Arts and Sciences for 60 years. He was a member of the Dutch Mathematical Society for 75 years. He was editor of Nieuw Archief voor Wiskunde from 1897 to his death in 1941.

An experiment conducted aboard the International Space Station in 2003 (Miscible Fluids in Microgravity) was mounted to prove one of Korteweg's theories.

The asteroid 9685 Korteweg and the Korteweg-de Vries Institute for Mathematics are named after him.

== See also ==
- Cnoidal wave
- Korteweg–de Vries equation
- Moens–Korteweg equation
