= Distensibility =

Distensibility is a metric of the stiffness of blood vessels. It is defined as

$D = \frac{d_{sys}-d_{dias}}{(p_{sys}-p_{dias})d_{dias}}$,

where $d_{sys}$ and $d_{dias}$ are the diameter of the vessel in systole and diastole, and $p_{sys}$and $p_{dias}$are the systolic and diastolic blood pressure.
