= Frederick Akbar Mahomed =

British doctor

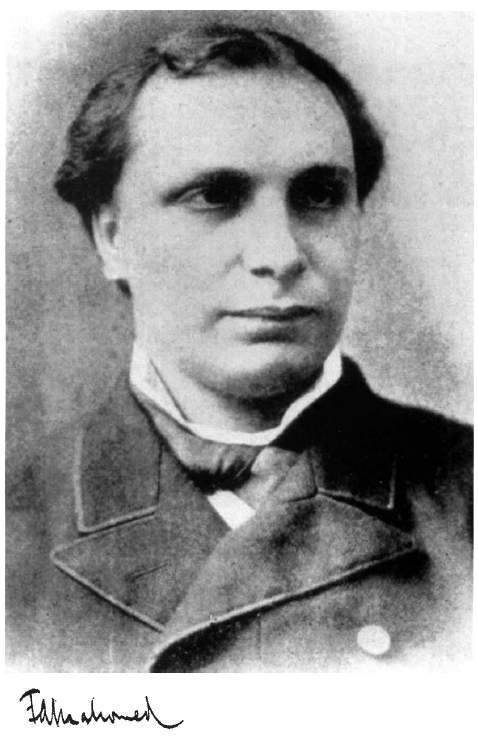
The only known photograph of Dr Mahomed

Frederick Henry Horatio Akbar Mahomed (11 April 1849 – 22 November 1884) was an internationally known British physician from Brighton, England.

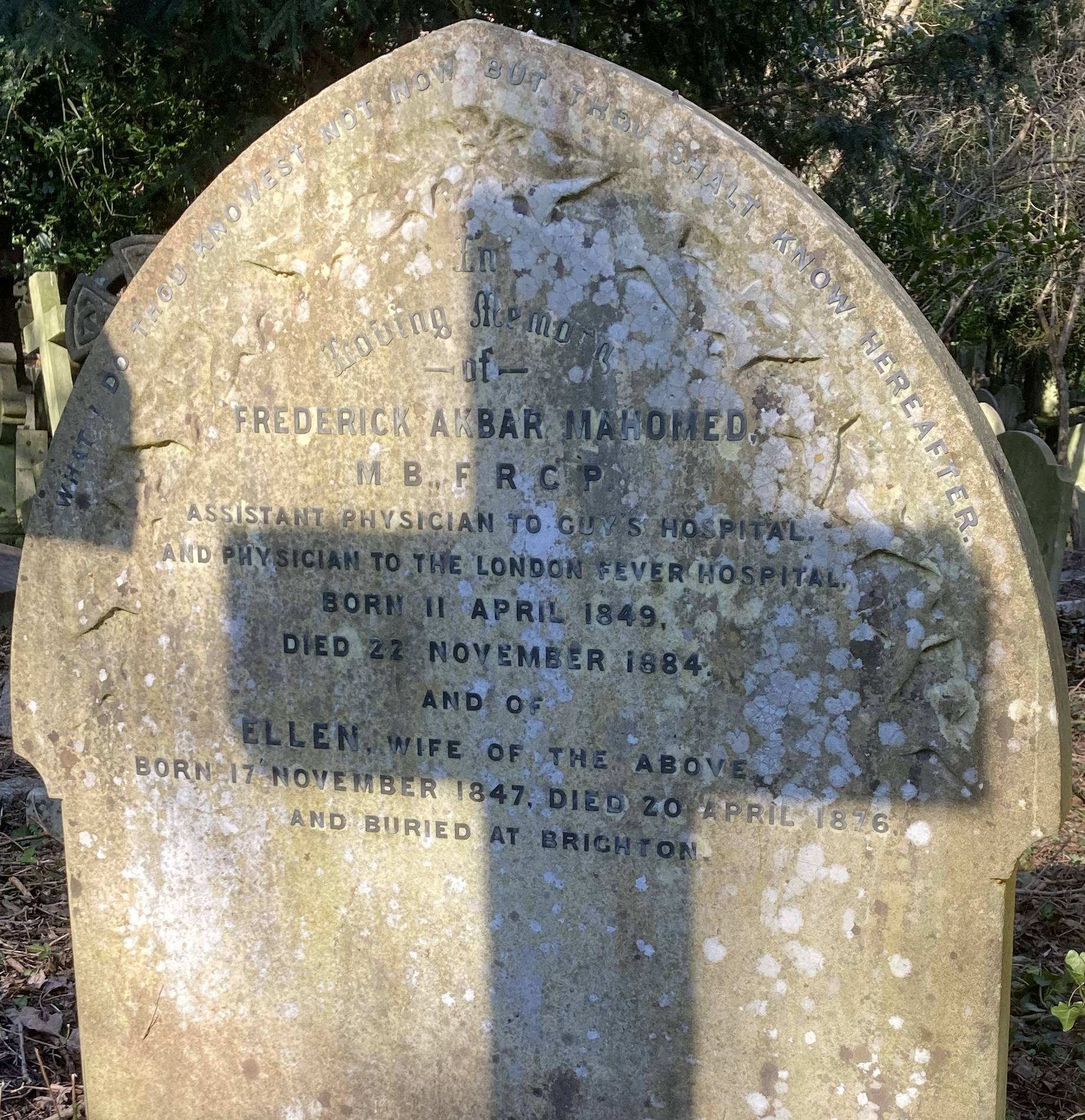
Grave of Frederick Akbar Mohomed in Highgate Cemetery

== Family and personal life ==
Frederick Henry Horatio Akbar Mahomed was born on 11 April 1849 in Brighton. He was the eldest son of Frederick Mahomed (1818–1888) and his second wife, Sarah Hodgkinson (1816–1905). He was also the grandson of the pioneering Indian traveller, author and entrepreneur Sake Dean Mahomed who was born in the city of Patna. Frederick Akbar Mahomed's father, Frederick Mahomed, ran a fencing, gymnastics and callisthenics academy in Hove, which included boxing instruction. Cameron and Hicks dispute the suggestion that he ran Victorian Turkish baths at Brighton attributing this to a confusion of Mahomed's father Frederick with his uncle, Arthur. Mahomed had three brothers (Arthur George Suleiman, James Deen Kerriman and Henry), and one sister (Adeline). He was educated privately in Brighton prior to attending medical school.

On June 14, 1873, at the parish church of St Nicholas', Brighton, Mahomed married Ellen (Nellie) Chalk. The couple had two children, a son, Archibald in 1874 and a daughter, Ellen in 1876. Only a month after the birth of Ellen in 1876, his wife, Ellen, died suddenly of sepsis and Mahomed and his family moved in with his uncle, Horatio, also a widower, in Seymour Street near Portman Square, London. In 1879 Mahomed married Ada Chalk, the younger sister of his first wife. As such a marriage was not legal under English law, the couple married in Switzerland. They lived at 12 St Thomas Street, close to Guy's Hospital. The couple had two daughters, Dorothy in 1880, and Janet in 1881, and a son, Humphry in 1883. In 1884 the family moved from St Thomas' Street into a six-story Georgian house at 24 Manchester Square. Later that year, Mahomed contracted typhoid fever, presumably from a patient at the London Fever Hospital, where he was working. He died on 22 November 1884 from an intestinal hemorrhage and a perforated intestine. He was buried on the western side of Highgate Cemetery. On his death a subscription was set up to assist his family and several notable physicians, including Sir William Gull, Sir Samuel Wilks, Sir James Paget and Elizabeth Garrett Anderson, contributed. His oldest son, Archibald, later became a doctor, and in 1914 Archibald and the rest of the family changed their name to Deane (possibly acknowledging Frederick's grandfather's name, Deen) to lessen the impact of the xenophobia and racial prejudice associated with the outbreak of the World War I.

== Education and career ==
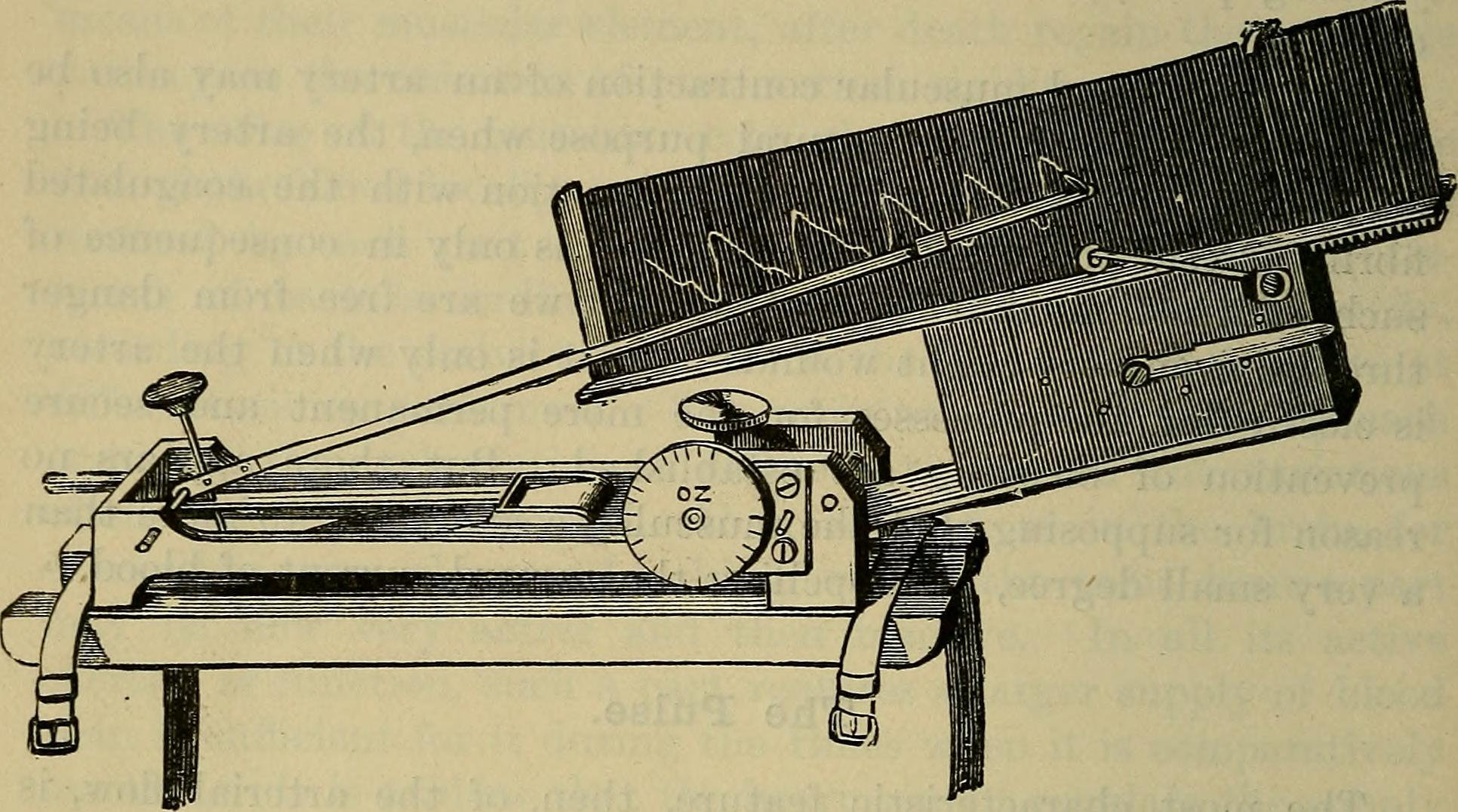
Marey's Sphygmograph, modified by Mahomed

In 1867, aged 18, Mahomed began to study medicine at the Sussex County Hospital, Brighton. Two years later in October 1869, he entered Guy's Hospital, London as a medical student. He was an outstanding student and, in 1871, won the student Pupils' Physical Society prize for his work on the sphygmograph, having been runner-up the previous year. Mahomed qualified as a Member of the Royal College of Surgeons in 1872. Following qualification, Mahomed worked at Highgate Infirmary (St Pancras' North Infirmary, Central London Sick Asylum) for a year. In 1873, he was appointed as resident medical officer at the London Fever Hospital in Liverpool Street, Islington. In 1874 Mahomed became a member of the Royal College of Physicians and was appointed as Student Tutor and Pathologist at St Mary's Hospital, Paddington. In 1875, Mahomed gained a doctorate (M.D.) from the University of Brussels. In 1877, he returned to Guy's Hospital as a Registrar (Senior Resident). He was elected as a Fellow of the Royal College of Physicians in 1880, and in 1881, he was awarded an M.B. from Cambridge University for his thesis on "Chronic Bright's disease without albuminuria". In the same year, he was appointed Assistant Physician at Guy's Hospital and, in 1882, he was appointed as a Demonstrator in Morbid Anatomy at Guy's Hospital.

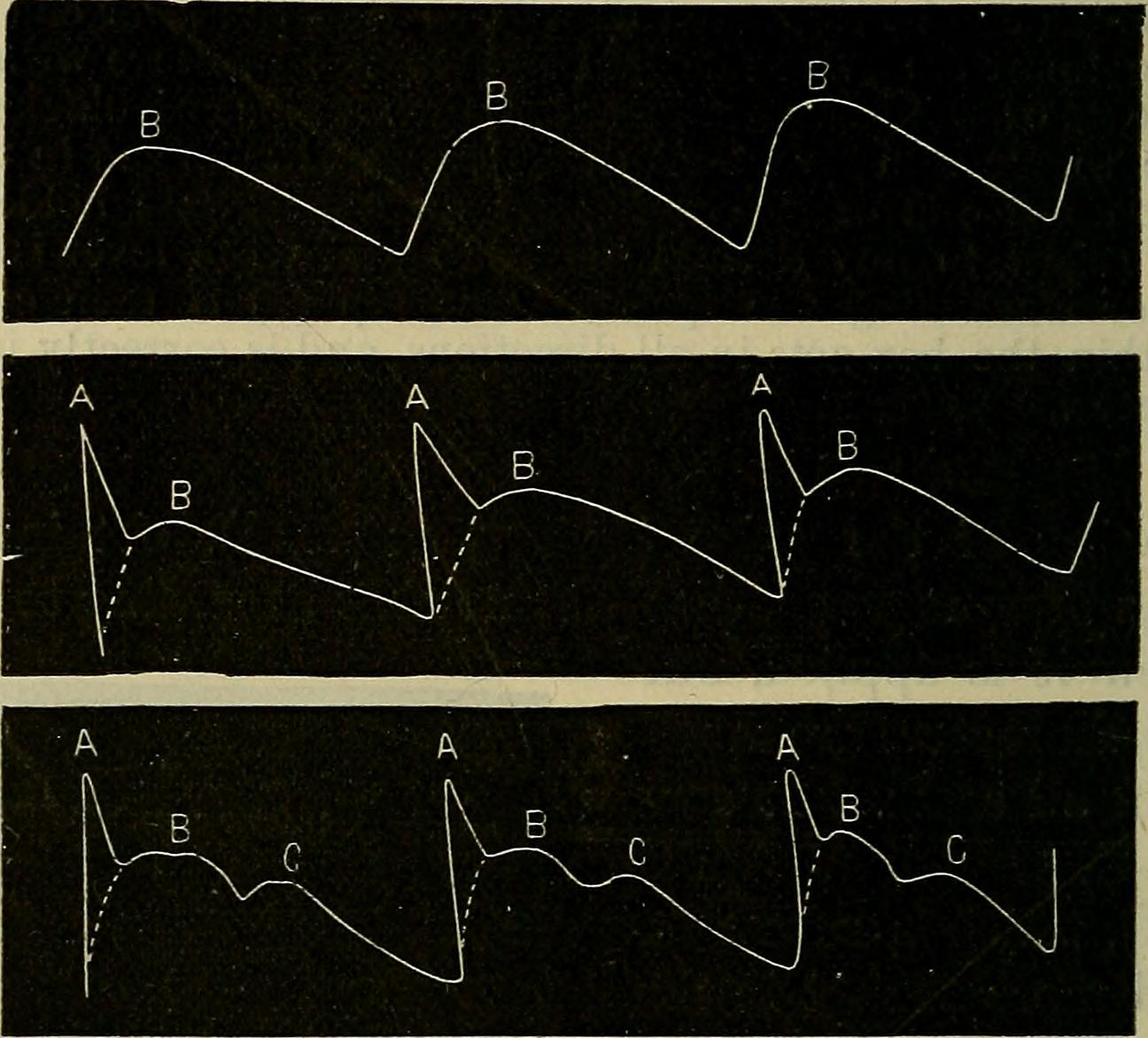
Diagram of the formation of the pulse (Mahomed)

Mahomed‘s earliest contribution, while still a medical student, was to improve the sphygmograph, a device for measuring blood pressure that had originally been devised by Karl von Vierordt and further developed by Étienne-Jules Marey. Mahomed’s major innovation was to make the sphygmograph quantitative, so that it was able to measure arterial blood pressure (in Troy ounces). The description of the modified instrument was published in 1872. Following his graduation in the same year, Mahomed took up an appointment at the Central London Sick Asylum, where he worked with Sir William Broadbent, who became a strong supporter and friend. Several of Mahomed’s pulse tracings are contained in Broadbent’s classic book, The Pulse. Mahomed used the new sphygmograph to measure arterial tension (blood pressure) in Bright's disease and a range of other conditions, including pregnancy, scarlet fever, gout, alcohol and lead poisoning. He found that in some individuals blood pressure was elevated before there was evidence of kidney disease, assessed by measurement of protein in the urine (proteinuria). He also made the association between the elevated blood pressure and various post-mortem changes, including enlargement of the heart (cardiac hypertrophy), thickening and fibrosis of the arterial wall, aneurysm formation, and damage to the microcirculation (arterio-capillary fibrosis). In effect, Mahomed was describing most of the key pathological effects of essential hypertension for the first time. Initially he termed this condition "Bright's disease without albuminuria" but later he described it as “high pressure diathesis”. His description of the condition is worth citing:

‘…the existence of this abnormally high pressure does not necessarily mean disease, but only a tendency towards disease. It is a functional condition, not necessarily a permanent one, though it is generally more or less so in these individuals. These persons appear to pass on through life pretty much as others do… As age advances the enemy gains accessions of strength; perhaps the mode of life assists him—good living and alcoholic beverages make secure his position, or head work, mental anxiety, hurried meals, constant excitement, inappropriate or badly cooked food, or any other of the common but undesirable circumstances of everyday life, tend to intensify the existing condition, or, if not previously present, perhaps produce it. Now under this greatly increased arterial pressure, hearts begin to hypertrophy and arteries to thicken; what has previously been a functional condition tends to become more of the nature of an organic one…’

Mahomed also proposed that reducing blood pressure would prolong life, although the means of doing that in his era were in the main limited to lifestyle advice.

In 1880 Mahomed made a first foray into public health. He wrote to the British Medical Journal to advocate undertaking the comprehensive systematic documentation of disease in Britain; he termed this idea, Collective Investigation. Mahomed’s proposals were warmly supported by Sir George Murray Humphry, the President of the British Medical Association, and a Collective Investigation Committee was formed in 1881 with Mahomed as secretary. Around this time Mahomed became acquainted with the British polymath, Francis Galton, who shared an interest in factors predisposing to disease. Mahomed and Galton collaborated to produce composite photographs of over 400 patients with phthisis (tuberculosis), which they compared with composite photographs based on 200 individuals without evidence of phthisis to test whether, as was widely believed, appearance or looks indicated a predisposition to disease. They found no evidence of a characteristic facial appearance associated with tuberculosis beyond some evidence of emaciation.

In 1882 Mahomed advocated expanding Collective Investigation to include a general collection of detailed family life histories:

'for encouraging patients to keep carefully prepared records of their lives and of the chief incidents therein, both medical and otherwise. These records would prove of very great value, alike to the patient, to the doctor, and to medical science.'

A life-history subcommittee of the Collective Investigation Committee, including both Mahomed and Galton was formed in 1882.

Initially the Collective Investigation Committee was very successful with 54 local Collective Investigation Committees being formed to collect data. Their preliminary findings were published in 1883 as a 76-page single volume called 'The Collective Investigation Record' and included results based on more than 2000 patients. In 1884, a Life History Album was published to allow parents to record details of family circumstances and child development. It was advertised in Nature and Galton offered prizes of £500 to people who submitted the most complete family records - within 5 months he had received in excess of 150 records. Over the subsequent 5 years data based on over 300 family records were published, with the main findings summarised in Galton’s book, Natural Inheritance. However, Mahomed would not see these achievements as he died in November 1884 from typhoid fever.

== Contribution ==
Michael F. O'Rourke summarizes the contributions of Frederick Akbar Mahomed as follows:

In detailed clinical studies, he separated chronic nephritis with secondary hypertension from what we now term essential hypertension. He described the constitutional basis and natural history of essential hypertension and pointed out that this disease could terminate with nephrosclerosis and renal failure. His clinical studies were done without the benefit of a sphygmomanometer but with the aid of a quantitative sphygmogram that he had initially developed while a medical student. He described characteristic features of the pressure pulse in patients with high blood pressure and in persons with arteriosclerosis consequent on aging. These pressure wave changes have recently been verified and explained. He contributed to a number of other advances in medical care, including blood transfusion and appendectomy for appendicitis. He initiated the Collective Investigation Record for the British Medical Association; this organization collected data from physicians practicing outside the hospital setting and was the precursor of modern collaborative clinical trials.

== See also ==
- Sake Dean Mahomed
