= Bholanath Bose =

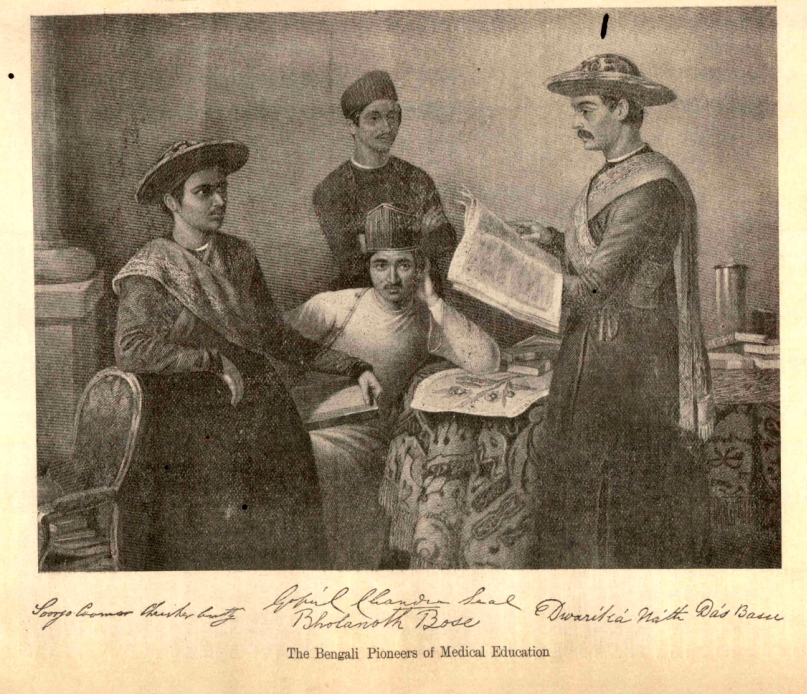
Dr. Bhola Nath Bose sitting at centre leaning on table

Bholanath Bose (1825–1884) was a pioneering Indian physician and one of the first Indians to study medicine in England, laying the groundwork for Western medicine in India. Sponsored by a consortium of Indian and British benefactors, Bose overcame significant social taboos to travel overseas and earn advanced medical degrees, including an MD. On returning to India, he served in various prestigious roles, including surgeon and superintendent at the Sukea Lane Dispensary in Calcutta and as a civil medical officer in Bengal. His legacy is celebrated in institutions like the Dr. Bhola Nath Bose Sub Divisional Hospital in Barrackpore, which continues to serve his community.

== Early life and education ==
Bose was born in 1825 in Barrackpore, Bengal. He received his early education at the Barrackpore Government High School, established by Lord Auckland, the then Governor-General of India. Lord Auckland frequently visited the school and took a special interest in young Bholanath, recognizing his potential and bright future. With Auckland's patronage, Bholanath was granted admission to Calcutta Medical College, where he excelled as one of its most promising students. To support his education, Lord Auckland provided him with a stipend of ten rupees per month from his own estate.

== Overseas studies in England ==
In the 1840s, a consortium led by Baboo Dwarkanath Tagore, the directors of the East India Company, and other benefactors sponsored four Indian students from Bengal to study medicine in England. This initiative aimed to herald the arrival of Western medicine in India. The selected students included Bholanath Bose, already recognized as a distinguished medical student. Under the guardianship of Dr. Henry Goodeve, Bose and his fellow students overcome societal taboos against Indians traveling overseas—a practice that was considered forbidden by many at the time.

== Achievements in England ==
In England, Bose earned his MRCS and a first-division Bachelor of Medicine degree. According to Michael H. Fisher's book Counterflows to Colonialism: Indian Travellers and Settlers in Britain 1600–1857, Bose was awarded gold medals in Botany and Comparative Anatomy, along with silver medals in Chemistry and Materia Medica. He also received certificates in Midwifery, Medicine, and Surgery and eventually earned an MD degree, likely becoming the first Indian to achieve this advanced qualification and a foreign degree in medicine. He earned gold medal in Comparative Anatomy, Certificate in Surgery, Ditto in Practice of Medicine, Ditto in Midwifery.

== Return to India and medical career ==
Upon returning to India after three years of study, Bose was appointed an uncovenanted medical officer and took up the role of surgeon and superintendent at the Sukea Lane Dispensary in Calcutta. His military career included serving in the Anglo-Sikh War of 1848–49, for which he was awarded a medal with a clasp, and he later served during the Santhal Rebellion of 1855.

Throughout his career, Bose held various medical positions, including civil medical officer in Faridpur, Bengal. Despite the Indian Medical Service Examination opening to Indians in 1855, he did not take it, likely due to his age and already established career.

== Legacy and final years ==
Bose's life ended in 1884 due to a carbuncle on his neck, though some accounts suggest he may have died in 1882. His legacy endures through his philanthropic contributions, including funding for dispensaries, one of which was established in Barrackpore. The Doctor Bhola Nath Bose Sub Divisional Hospital in Barrackpore, named in his honor, continues his mission by serving the local community as a reputable medical institution.
