= Sphygmograph =

Device to measure blood pressure

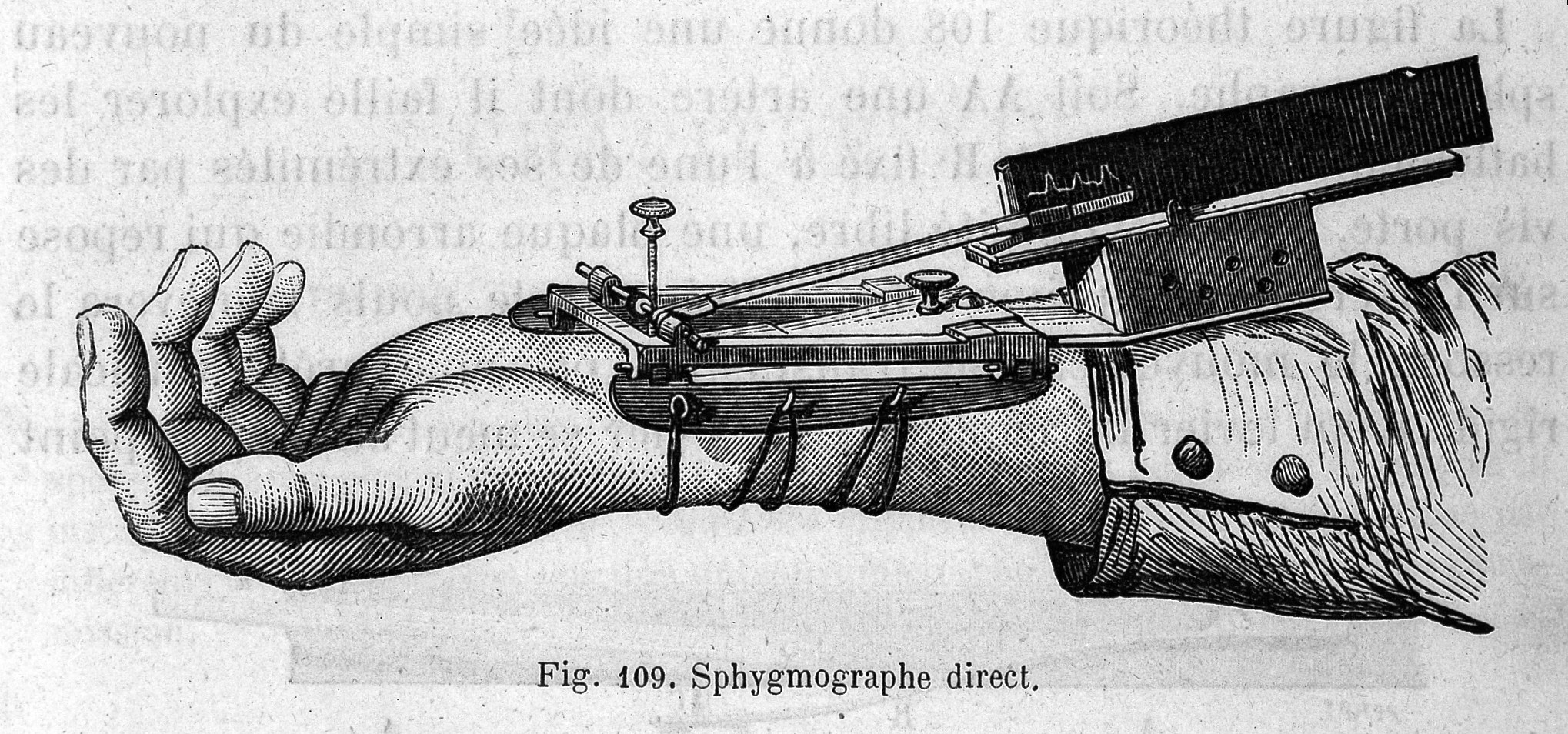
A sphygmograph, probably of Etienne-Jules Marey's design

The sphygmograph (/ˈsfɪɡməˌɡræf, ˌɡrɑːf/ SFIG-mə-graf) was a mechanical device used to measure blood pressure in the mid-19th century. It was invented in 1854 by German physiologist Karl von Vierordt (1818–1884), and later redesigned by other physicians including Étienne-Jules Marey. In the United States and Britain, the sphygmograph was used to study the human heartbeat and to measure blood pressure. In Britain, it was also used in psychiatric asylums. Its usage declined in popularity by the end of the century, though it is remembered as an important device that preceded the introduction of the sphygmomanometer.

== History ==
=== Origin and development ===
The sphygmograph (meaning "pulse writer") was invented by German physiologist Karl von Vierordt in 1854. Using a series of quantified weights, the device compressed the radial artery, which stopped the wearer's pule and allowed their systolic blood pressure to be measured. Von Vierordt's original model measured 168cm long.

In 1863, the sphygmograph was redesigned by Étienne-Jules Marey: it was made portable, fitted with springs rather than weighs, and recorded the trace on paper. Beginning in the late 1860s, when American medical students returned from their studies in Europe they brought the sphygmograph back with them to the United States, where it was redesigned again: Edgar Holden of Newark modified Marey's model by removing the wrist straps and changing the pulse spring system; Alonzo Thrasher Keyt of Cincinnati invented "the compound sphygmograph" in 1875; Erasmus Allington Pond of Massachusetts presented a model to the Suffolk District Medical Society in 1875 that later became commercially successful.

=== Use ===
The invention of the sphygmograph was not received with excitement: in an April 1860 issue of The Lancet, it was commented, "It may be doubted whether these instruments, though very ingenious, will ever actually prove useful in practice." By the early 1870s, American catalogues advertised several varieties of European sphygmograph models. The most popular model was the Dudgeon sphygmograph, which was priced at approximately $25. In both Britain and the United States, it was not a commonly used instrument.

The sphygmograph was the only method of studying cardiac arrhythmias until the introduction of electrocardiography. Cardiologist James Mackenzie used a sphygmograph to capture the first recording of atrial fibrillation. Frederick Akbar Mahomed used the sphygmograph to collect data about essential hypertension. In British psychiatric asylums, it was used to record the effects of general paralysis of the insane, epileptic seizures and hypnosis. The sphygmograph was also employed to chart the toxicological impacts of calabar beans and digitalis on the human body.

=== Decline in use ===
By the 1890s, the sphygmograph was no longer used in medical practice. Its popularity declined because it was impractical and inconsistent. Tracings were difficult to interpret, and it proved unable to diagnose heart diseases and quantitate blood pressure as originally hoped. Although pessimistic of its capabilities, cardiologist Paul Dudley White included sphygmographic traces in his cardiology textbook published in 1931.

== Legacy ==
Sphygmographic traces taught practitioners to "visualize the cardiovascular system in terms of a dynamic recording of amplitude over time". It also paved the way for the introduction of the sphygmomanometer in later years.
