= Étienne-Jules Marey =

French scientist and chronophotographer

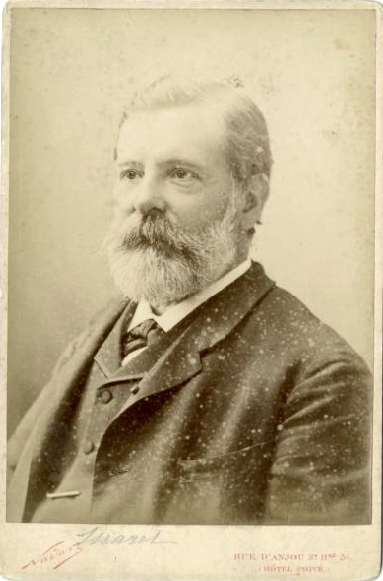
Étienne Jules Marey around 1880, by Félix Nadar.

Étienne-Jules Marey (French: [etjɛn ʒyl maʁɛ]; 5 March 1830, Beaune, Côte-d'Or – 15 May 1904, Paris) was a French scientist, physiologist, and chronophotographer.

His work was significant in the development of cardiology, physical instrumentation, aviation, cinematography, and the science of laboratory photography. He is widely considered to be a pioneer of photography and an influential pioneer of the history of cinema. He was also a pioneer in establishing a variety of graphical techniques for the display and interpretation of quantitative data from physiological measurement.

== Biography ==
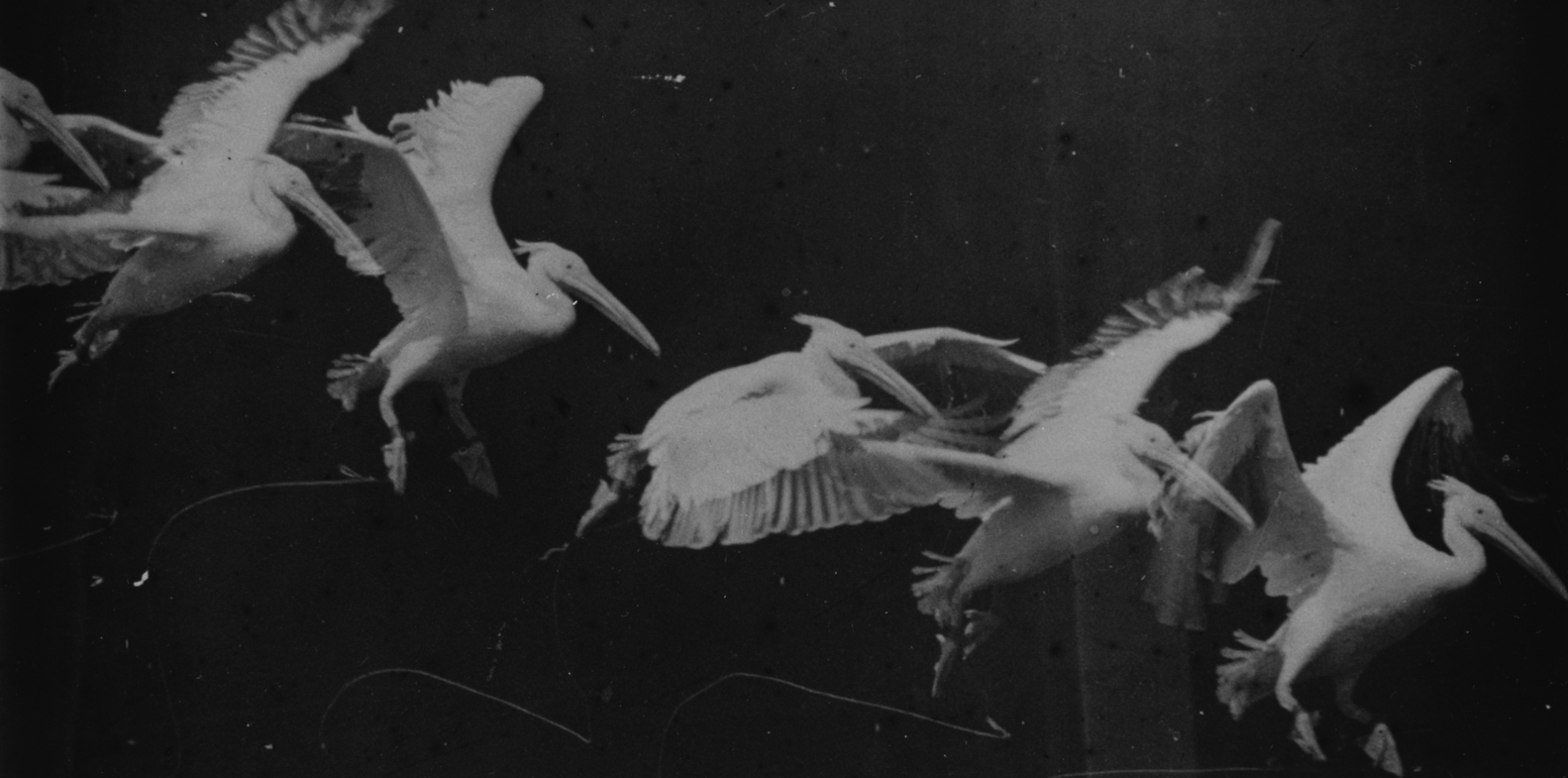
Flying pelican captured by Marey around 1882. He created a method of recording several phases of movement superimposed into one photograph

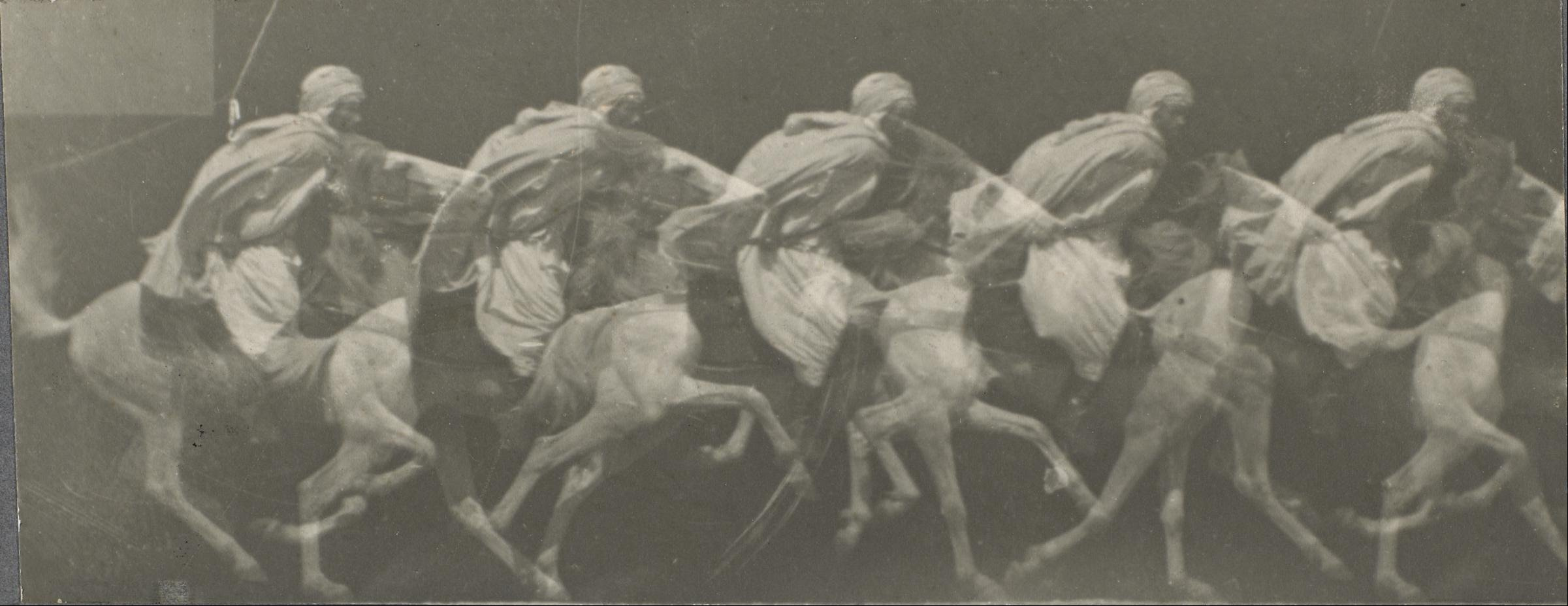
A galloping horse

Marey started by studying blood circulation in the human body. He then shifted to analyzing heart beats, respiration, muscles (myography), and movement of the body. To aid his studies, he developed many instruments for precise measurements. For example, in 1859, in collaboration with the physiologist Auguste Chauveau and the watch manufacturer Breguet, he developed a wearable Sphygmograph to measure the pulse. This sphygmograph was an improvement on an earlier and more cumbersome design by the German physiologist Karl von Vierordt. In 1869, Marey constructed a very delicate artificial insect to show how an insect flies and to demonstrate the figure-8 shape it produced during movement of its wings. He fixed a gold foil to an insect wing and shone light on it to study the flapping of the wing. He also used a soot covered glass-fibre introduced along the path of the insect wing to determine if it crossed with the wing in the upper stroke or lower stroke by examining the side on which the soot was cleared. Then, he became fascinated by movements of air and started to study bigger flying animals, like birds. He adopted and further developed animated photography into a separate field of chronophotography in the 1880s. His revolutionary idea was to record several phases of movement on one photographic surface. In 1890, he published a substantial volume entitled Le Vol des Oiseaux (The Flight of Birds), which was illustrated with photographs, drawings, and diagrams. He also created precise sculptures of various flying birds.

Marey studied other animals too. He published La Machine animale in 1873 (translated as "Animal Mechanism"). The English photographer Eadweard Muybridge carried out his "Photographic Investigation" in Palo Alto, California, to prove that Marey was right when he wrote that a galloping horse for a brief moment had all four hooves off the ground. Muybridge published his photos in 1879 and received some public attention.

Marey hoped to merge anatomy and physiology. To better understand his chronophotographic images, he compared them with images of the anatomy, skeleton, joints, and muscles of the same species. Marey produced a series of drawings showing a horse trotting and galloping, first in the flesh and then as a skeleton.

The presence and activity of Marey in Naples is well documented, in particular thanks to the documentation preserved in the historical archive of the Stazione Zoologica Anton Dohrn. Marey began to travel to Naples presumably because of his relation with madame Vilbort, wife of Joseph Vilbort, the director of the French journal Le Globe. Madame Vilbort moved to Naples to cure her illness, thanks to the warm climate, and Marey followed her. Marey and madame Vilbort bought villa Maria in Posillipo in 1880. Marey accomplished in Naples part of his studies aimed at the realization of his pre-cinematographic tools and in the Dohrn zoological station studied the movement of fishes hosted in the aquarium's tanks. In a letter dated 1 November 1876, Marey requested the Stazione Zoologica to provide live ray fishes for his studies. Among the documentation that notes the collaboration of Marey with Anton Dohrn is the archive at the zoological station which preserves photos where the two appear together during an excursion and show Marey on board Dohrn's boat. The usage of the chronophotographic gun, which Marey used to aim at birds, but without shooting, appeared unusual to local people who referred to Marey sometimes as the "silly from Posillipo" ("lo scemo di Posillipo").

He proposed "Marey's Law", a law that stated that an increase in blood pressure caused a lowering of the heart rate and vice versa.

He also invented "Marey's tambour" for physiological experiments.

== Chronophotography ==
Marey's chronophotographic gun was first made in 1882. This instrument was capable of taking 12 consecutive frames a second, with all the frames recorded on the same picture. Using these pictures, he studied horses, birds, dogs, sheep, donkeys, elephants, fish, microscopic creatures, molluscs, insects, reptiles, etc. Some call it Marey's "animated zoo". Marey also conducted the famous study about cats always landing on their feet. He conducted very similar studies with a chicken and a dog and found that they could do almost the same. Marey also studied human locomotion. He published another book, Le Mouvement, in 1894.

Marey's chronophotographic gun
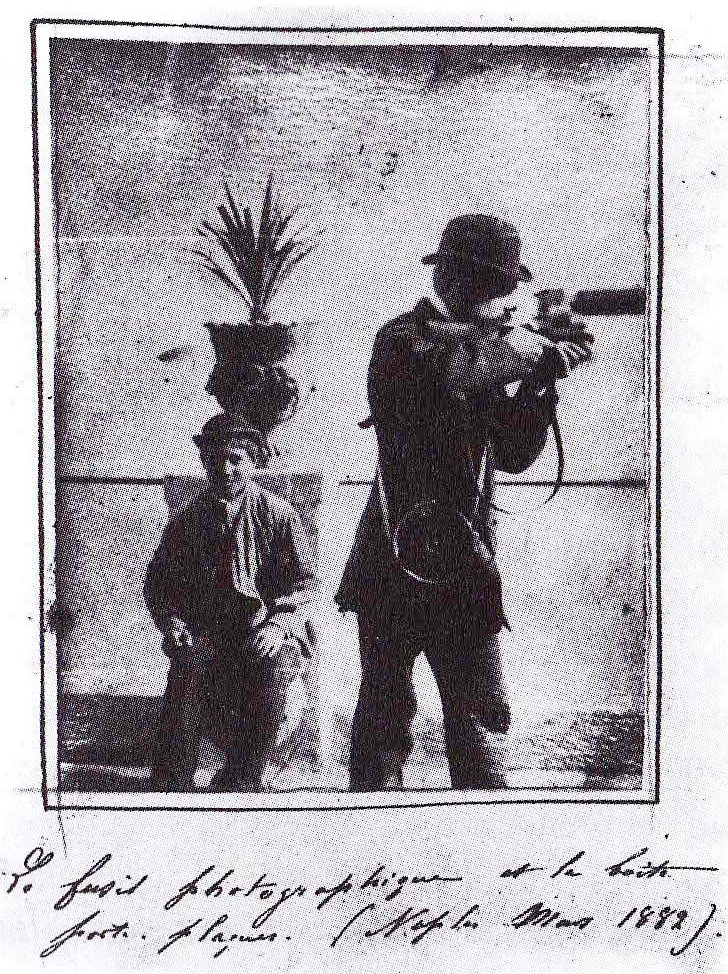
Étienne-Jules Marey in Napoli. In the hand notes the date is readable: "March 1882"

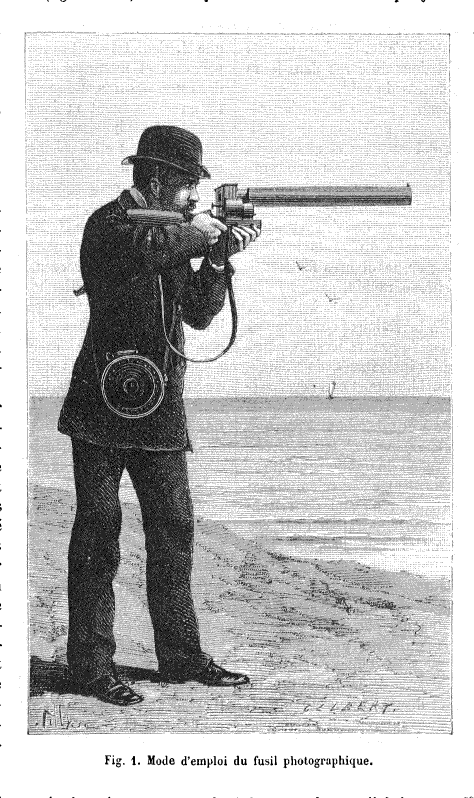
Illustration of the chronophotographic gun from La Nature n. 464, 22 April 1882, p. 326

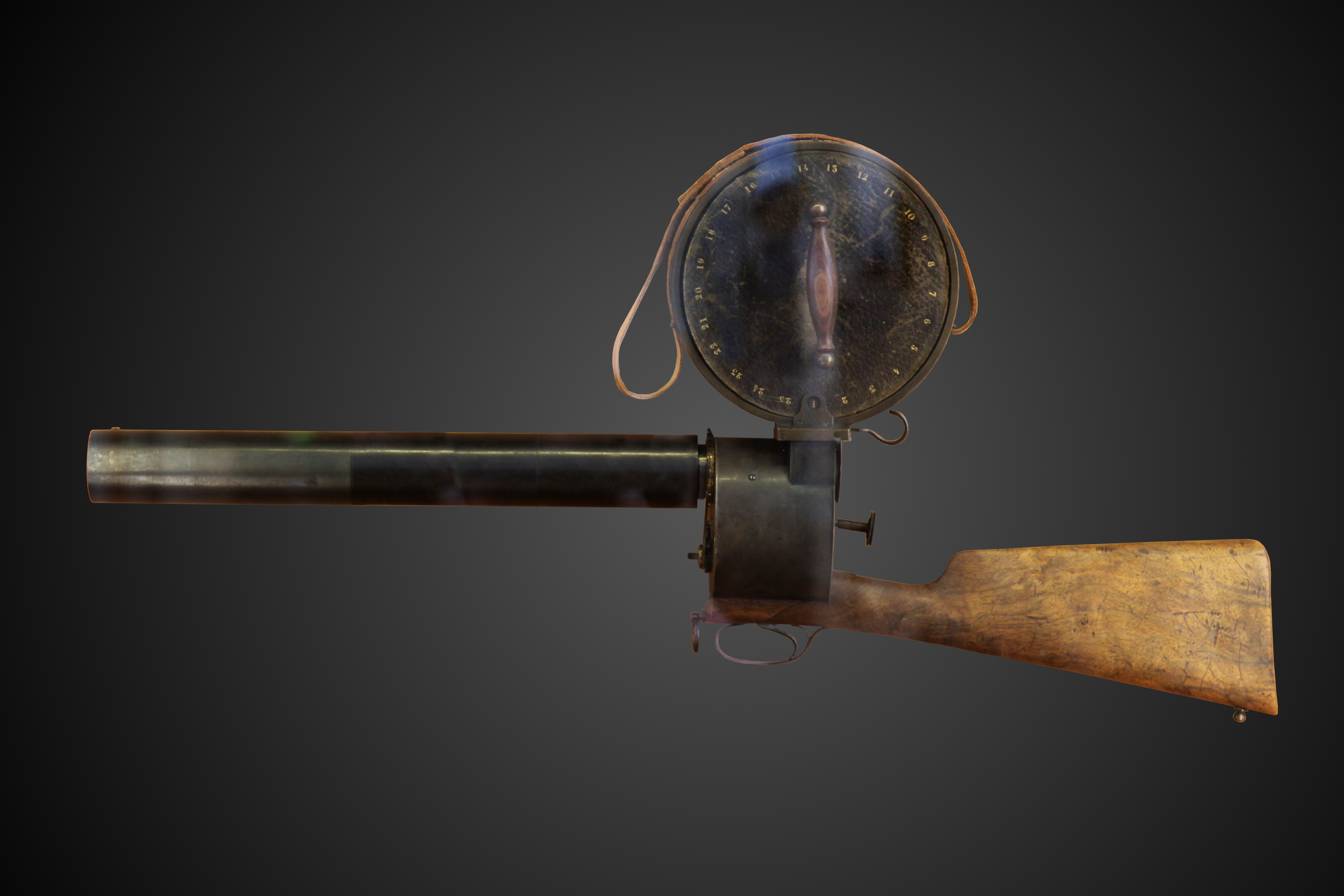
Marey's photographic gun, on display at Conservatoire national des arts et métiers.

A moving image from 1900 demonstrating shot put technique

In 1885, Marey mentioned how he could playback the animation from his gun using the phenakistiscope. In 1889, he developed the chronophotographe camera, which took images on film at even spacing. He however did not manage to play it back as he was unable to move between the frames in an even manner. Edison visited Marey in 1889 and was able to solve the problem using a sprocketed film advance mechanism along with W.L. Dickison, who was developing something using the cylindrical model of the phonograph.

Towards the end of his life, he returned to studying the movement of quite abstract forms, like a falling ball. His last great work was the observation and photography of smoke trails. This research was partially funded by Samuel Pierpont Langley under the auspices of the Smithsonian Institution, after the two met in Paris at the Exposition Universelle (1900). In 1901, he was able to build a smoke machine with 58 smoke trails. It became one of the first aerodynamic wind tunnels.

== Bibliography ==
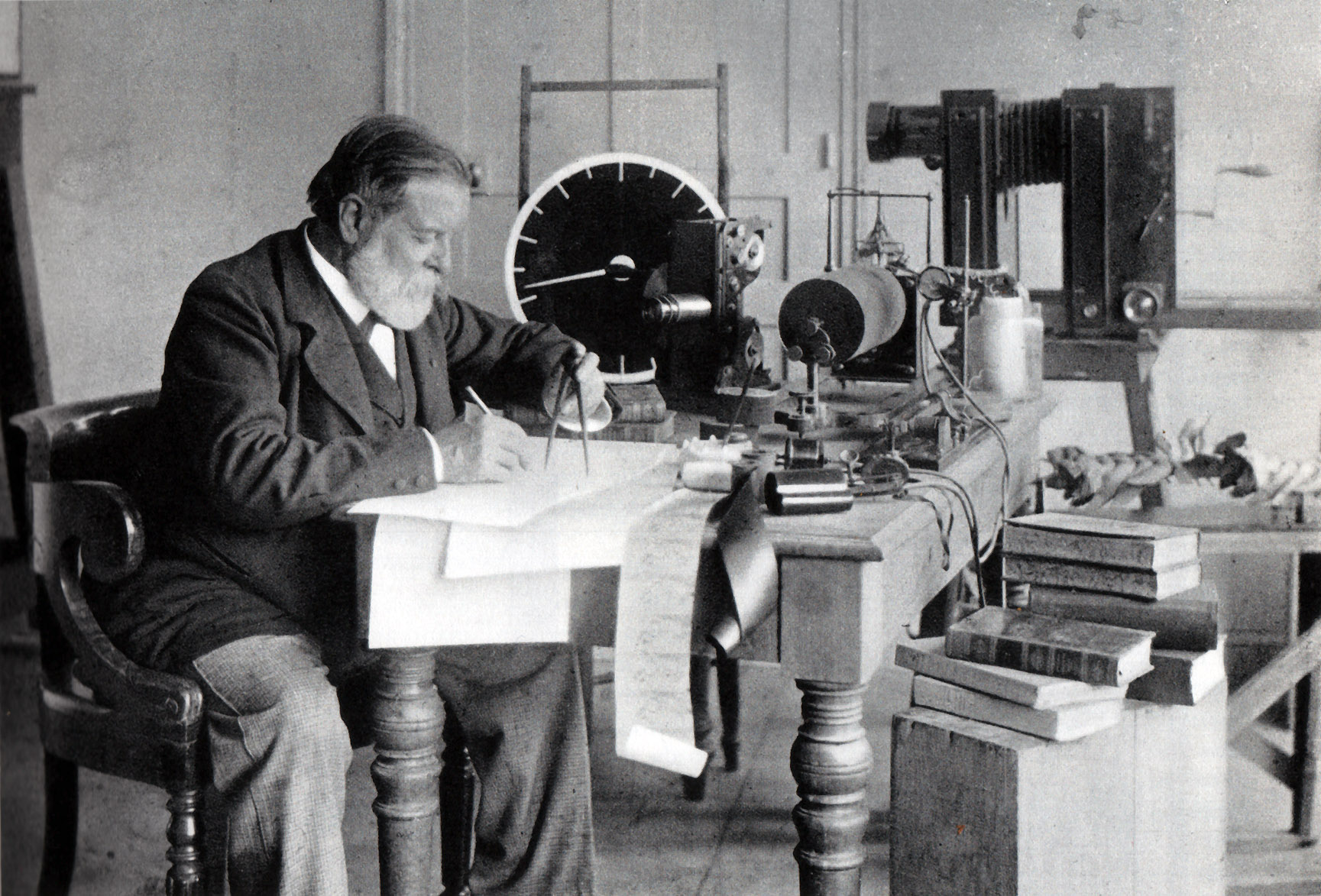
Marey among his inventions (sphygmograph, sound-recording instruments, model of bird-flight, projector, camera)

- Physiologie médicale de la circulation du sang (1863) (Physiology of blood circulation.)
- Études physiologiques sur les caractères graphiques des battements du cœur (1865) (Physiological studies on the graphic characteristics of heartbeats.)
- Du mouvement dans les fonctions de la vie (Movement in the functions of life.)
  - Experiments done in his private laboratory – La Revue scientifique (1866)
  - Experiments done at Collège de France – Germer-Baillière (1868)
- Du vol des oiseaux (The flight of birds), La Revue scientifique 14, 21 August 11 September and 2 October 1869 (Text on line)
- La Machine animale. Locomotion terrestre et aérienne (The animal machine, terrestrial and aerial locomotion)(1873–1874)
- Physiologie expérimentale (Experimental physiology) (1875)
- Pression et vitesse du sang (Pressure and flow-rate of blood) (1876)
- Moteurs Animés. Expériences de physiologie graphique, (A Study in Motion) La Nature, N°278 – 28 September 1878 et N°279 – 5 October 1878
- La Méthode graphique dans les sciences expérimentales (1878) (Text on line)
- La Circulation du sang à l'état physiologique et dans les maladies (1881) (Text on line)
- Études pratiques sur la marche de l'homme. Expériences faites à la station physiologique du Parc des Princes., La Nature, N° 608 – 24 January 1885
- Le vol des oiseaux (1890) éd. G. Masson – Préface, La Revue scientifique, 19 October 1889
- Des appareils enregistreurs de la vitesse, La Nature, N°878 – 29 March 1890 (Text on line)
- Le vol des insectes étudié par la chronophotographie. La Nature N°974 – 30 Janvier 1892 Text on line
- Mouvements de natation de la raie, La Nature, N°1029 – 18 February 1893 (Text en line)
- Le Mouvement Des Liquides Étudié Par La Chronophotographie La Nature, N°1040 – 6 mai 1893 (Text en line)
- avec Georges Demenÿ, Études de physiologie artistique faites au moyen de la chronophotographie (1893)
- Des mouvements que certains animaux exécutent pour retomber sur leurs pieds, lorsqu'ils sont précipités d'un lieu élevé, La Nature, N°1119 – 10 November 1894 (Text en line)
- Le Mouvement (1894)
- La Station physiologique de Paris, La Revue scientifique, 29 December 1894 (Text en line) et 6 January 1895 (Text en line)
- Analyse des mouvements du cheval par la chronophotographie, La Nature, N°1306 – 11 Juin 1898 Text en line

== See also ==
- Eadweard Muybridge (1830–1904)
- Chronophotography
- Velocimetry
