= James Mackenzie (cardiologist) =

Scottish cardiologist (1853-1925)

Sir James Mackenzie
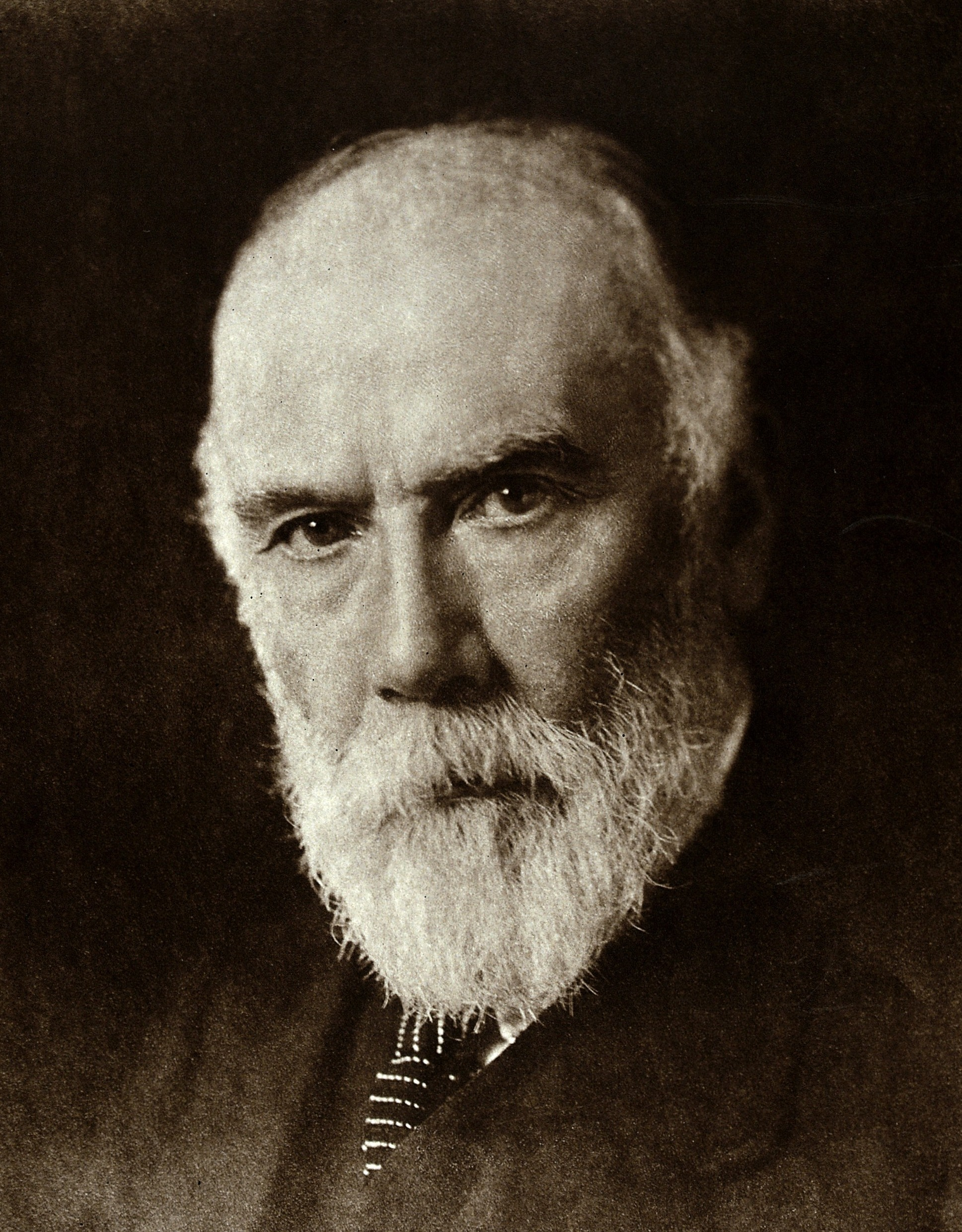
- Born: 12 April 1853; Scone, Scotland
- Died: 26 January 1925 (aged 71); London, England
- Scientific career
- Fields: Cardiology, General Practice

Sir James Mackenzie FRS FRCP (12 April 1853 – 26 January 1925) was a Scottish cardiologist who was a pioneer in the study of cardiac arrhythmias. Due to his work in the cardiac field he is known as a research giant in primary care, and was knighted by King George V in 1915.

== Biography ==
James Mackenzie was born at Pictonhill in Scone, where his father was a farmer. He left school at Perth Academy aged 14 and was apprenticed to a chemist. In 1873 he was offered a partnership in the chemist's firm but turned it down in order to study medicine. After private tuition in Latin he passed his entrance examination for the University of Edinburgh in October 1874 and qualified as a doctor in 1878. After completing his residency in Edinburgh, Mackenzie became a general practitioner in borough of Burnley in Lancashire, England where he continued to practice medicine for more than a quarter of a century. While he was engaged in a busy practice, he made many original observations, completed his MD degree on hemi-paraplegia spinalis (awarded by the University of Edinburgh in 1882) and had many scientific papers published. During Mackenzie's initial research carried out in the Burnley general practice he corresponded and discussed his findings with other well known pioneers Wenkebach and Osler. Mackenzie's ongoing investigations led him to leave general practice and become a specialist cardiologist. He expressed prophetic concerns about the specialisation of medicine including cardiology stating: 'I fear the day may come when a heart specialist will no longer be a physician looking at the body as a whole, but one with more and more complicated instruments working in a narrow and restricted area of the body – that was never my idea'.

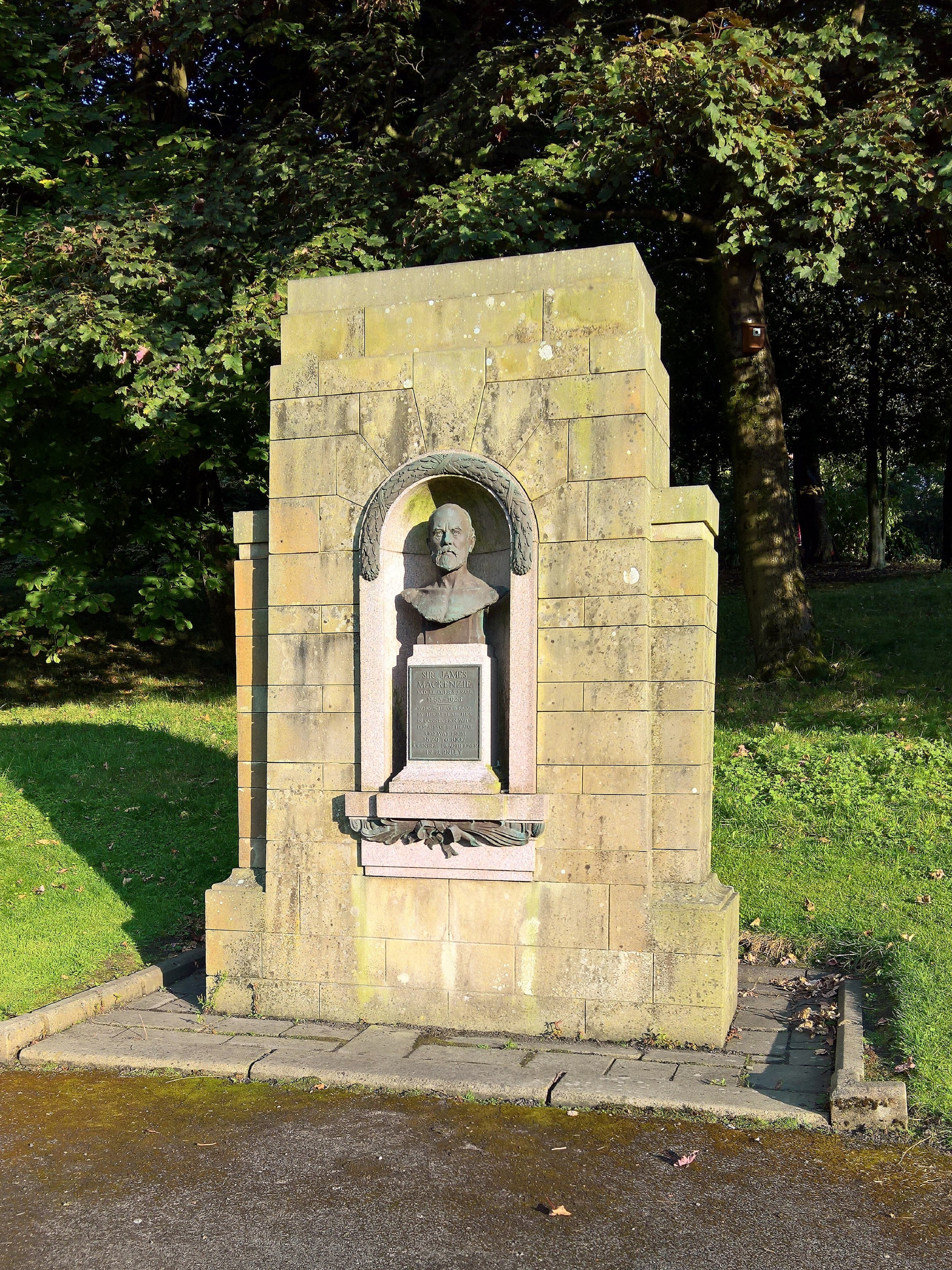
Memorial in Burnley, Lancashire.

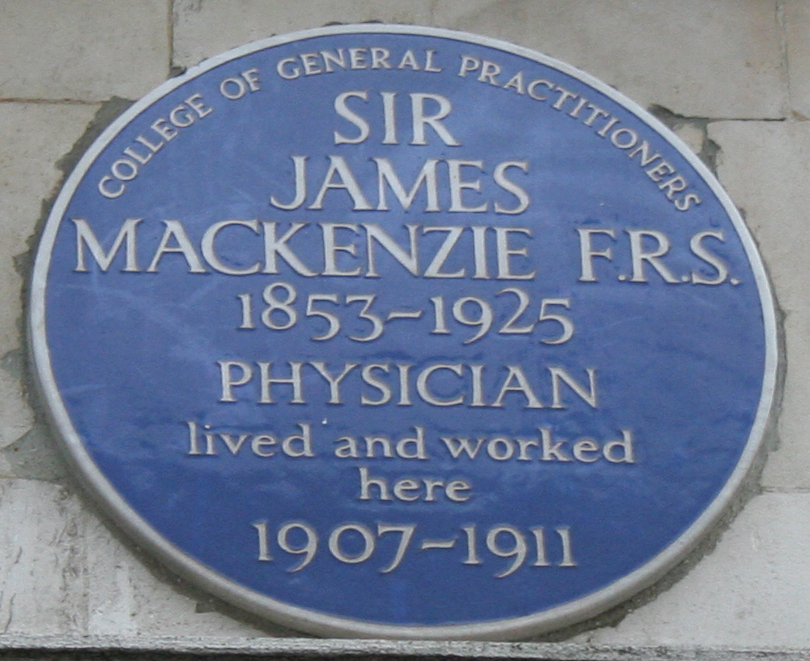
Blue plaque, London.

In his early studies, Mackenzie used Riva-Rocci's sphygmograph to graphically record the pulse. Later Mackenzie devised a "polygraph," that allowed him to make simultaneous records of the arterial and venous pulses. He used this to evaluate the condition of the heart and to measure the AV interval. In 1890 he discovered premature ventricular contractions and use of the polygraph enabled Mackenzie to make original distinctions between harmless and dangerous types of pulse irregularities (arrhythmias). Mackenzie also demonstrated the efficacy of Digitalis in the treatment of arrhythmias and made important contributions to the study of the energetics of the heart muscle.

In November 1907, Mackenzie left Burnley for London and set up as a consulting physician where his reputation grew rapidly. In 1915 he was elected a Fellow of the Royal Society and was knighted. Three years later he founded the influential Mackenzie Institute of Clinical Research in St Andrews, which involved local General Practitioners in detailed long-term recording of patients' symptoms and illnesses.

Ironically Mackenzie himself suffered from an irregular heart beat, as a result of ischemic heart disease. He had his first heart attack in 1901, and recorded in himself the atrial fibrillation that accompanied this episode. By 1907 Mackenzie experienced frequent episodes of angina pectoris which he mentioned to Sir Thomas Lewis and in 1908 he had a severe episode of cardiac pain, probably due to a myocardial infarction. His angina continued after 1908 and became progressively worse until in January 1925 he had a prolonged and severe attack of angina and died at around 4am on 26 January 1925. Before his death Mackenzie had asked that his friend John Parkinson perform an autopsy after his death. This was done and showed extensive coronary artery disease and evidence of recent and old myocardial infarction. A description of the case was published in the British Heart Journal in 1939. Two early polygraphs and a bronze bust of Mackenzie are in the collection of the Tayside Medical History Museum.

== Selected writings ==
- Mackenzie, James (1916). Principles of diagnosis and treatment in heart affections. London: Henry Frowde, Hodder & Stoughton.
- Mackenzie, James (1921). Heart disease and pregnancy. London: Henry Frowde, Hodder & Stoughton.
- Mackenzie, James (1909). Symptoms and their interpretation. London: Shaw & Sons.
- Mackenzie, James (1919). The future of medicine. London: Henry Frowde, Hodder & Stoughton.
- Mackenzie, James (1923). Angina pectoris. London: Henry Frowde, Hodder & Stoughton.
- Mackenzie, James (1908). Diseases of the heart. London: Henry Frowde, Hodder & Stoughton.
- Mackenzie, James (1902). The study of the pulse. Arterial, venous, and hepatic and of the movements of the heart. Edinburgh: Young J. Pentland.

== Other sources ==
- Murdoch J, Denz-Penhey H (October–December 2007). "John Flynn meets James Mackenzie: developing the discipline of rural and remote medicine in Australia". Rural Remote Health. 7 (4): 726. PMID 17944551.
- Murdoch JC. (October 1997). "Mackenzie's puzzle—the cornerstone of teaching and research in general practice". Br J Gen Pract. 47 (423): 656–8. PMC 1410103. PMID 9474833.
- McMichael J. (July 1981). "Sir James Mackenzie and atrial fibrillation—a new perspective". J R Coll Gen Pract. 31 (228): 402–6. PMC 1972130. PMID 7033523.
- Krikler, D M (1988). "Sir James Mackenzie". Clinical Cardiology. Vol. 11, no. 3 (published March 1988). pp. 193–4. doi:10.1002/clc.4960110312. PMID 3281772.
- McCormick, J S (1981). "James Mackenzie and coronary heart disease". The Journal of the Royal College of General Practitioners. Vol. 31, no. 222 (published January 1981). pp. 26–30. PMC 1971897. PMID 7021816.
- Borodulin, V I (1979). "[James Mackenzie and his place in the history of cardiology (on the 125th anniversary of his birth)]". Kardiologiia. Vol. 19, no. 5 (published May 1979). pp. 111–3. PMID 379406.
- STEVENSON, I (1953). "Sir James Mackenzie, 1853–1953". Am. Heart J. Vol. 46, no. 4 (published October 1953). pp. 479–84. doi:10.1016/0002-8703(53)90059-3. PMID 13092035.
- Fazekas, T; Liszkai, G; Bielik, H; Lüderitz, B (2003). "[History of atrial fibrillation]". Zeitschrift für Kardiologie. Vol. 92, no. 2 (published February 2003). pp. 122–7. doi:10.1007/s00392-003-0889-4. PMID 12596073.
- Fazekas, Tamás; Liszkai, Gizella (2002). "[History of atrial fibrillation]". Orvosi Hetilap. Vol. 143, no. 6 (published 10 February 2002). pp. 285–9. PMID 11915187.
- Moorhead, R (1999). "Sir James Mackenzie (1853–1925): views on general practice education and research". Journal of the Royal Society of Medicine. Vol. 92, no. 1 (published January 1999). pp. 38–43. PMC 1297041. PMID 10319040.
