= Michael H. Fisher =

American historian (born 1950)

Michael Herbert Fisher (born 1950) is emeritus Robert S. Danforth Professor of History at Oberlin College. He has published extensively about the interplay between Europeans and South Asians in South Asia and Europe. His three most widely held books are: The Travels of Dean Mahomet: An Eighteenth Century Journey through India, Migration: A World History, and A Short History of the Mughal Empire.

== Biography ==
=== Early life ===
Michael Fisher was born in 1950 to Roswita Hoffman 'Roz' Fisher and Robert Fisher. They had one other son, James.

In 1972, Fisher graduated from Trinity College in Hartford, Connecticut, with a B.A. degree, and thereafter entered the University of Chicago. There he received an M.A. in 1973 and a Ph.D. in 1978 for his dissertation The Imperial Court and the Province: A Social and Administrative History of Pre-British Awadh (1775-1856).

The same year, Fisher joined the faculty at Western Washington University as an assistant professor in the Department of Liberal Studies. Nine years later, his first book, A Clash of Cultures: Awadh, the British, and the Mughals, was published. Thomas R. Metcalf, in a review for The Journal of Asian Studies, praised it as "an excellent introduction to one of the most fascinating of India's dynasties", "carefully researched and eminently readable". Sarah Ansari, writing in Pacific Affairs, called the work a valuable addition to the scholarship on the period, but was occasionally disappointed "that the information being provided does not quite match up to the significance assigned to it".

=== Oberlin years ===
Fisher had become an associate professor by 1990, when Oberlin College hired him to teach South Asian history, a concentration never theretofore taught at the college. By then he had also married Paula Richman, a professor specializing in South Asian religions, who had taught at Western Washington University before joining the Oberlin faculty in 1985. In 1991, Oxford University Press published Fisher's book, Indirect Rule in India: Residents and the Residency System, 1764-1858, to mixed reviews. P. J. Marshall, writing in The English Historical Review, commended it as a "valuable study of the process of imperial expansion". John M. MacKenzie, in a review for The Historian, although acknowledging that "there is much that is admirable in this study", wrote that "there is little here to stimulate the imagination, nothing about personalities, incidents, or ideas. It is curiously bloodless in its impressiveness, representing for this reviewer a bland school of history from which historians have mercifully moved on".

Fisher published, in 1996, The First Indian Author in English: Dean Mahomed (1759-1851) in India, Ireland, and England, followed a year later by the related The Travels of Dean Mahomet: An Eighteenth Century Journey through India. Popular and academic reviewers alike widely praised Fisher's choice of topic and the context he adds to Dean Mahomed's writing. William Dalrymple, in a review for British magazine The Spectator, said the fascinating story overcame "Professor Fisher's plodding academese". The Sunday Times contributor Anthony Sattin wrote that "Fisher's style is academic and far from populist, but the tale he has to tell is extraordinary". Further favorable reviews came from Stephen F. Dale and Narasingha P. Sil.

Fisher served as chair of the history department from 1997 to 2001, a period in which the department was reshaped by unusually high faculty turnover, including the retirements of Geoffrey Blodgett, Marcia Colish, and Robert Soucy, and the departure of assistant professor Moon-Ho Jung for the University of Washington. Fisher was appointed the Robert S. Danforth Professor in History in 2002.

After his term as department chair, new books followed about every three years. Co-authored with Shompa Lahiri and Shindar Thandi, A South Asian History of Britain: Four Centuries of Peoples from the Indian Subcontinent was described by Keith Laybourn in journal History as a "superb survey of South Asians in Britain". It was praised by Francis Robinson in The Economic History Review for telling the story of South Asians in Britain well and "not shy[ing] away from some of the difficulties and nuances".

The Inordinately Strange Life of Dyce Sombre: Victorian Anglo Indian M.P. and Chancery 'Lunatic', a biography of colorful character David Ochterlony Dyce Sombre, was Fisher's second book to attract wide attention from both the academic and non-academic press. William Dalrymple, writing in The Observer said it "throws a fascinating light on the degree of hybridity and crosscultural contact possible during the period, as well as the limits that Victorian England eventually imposed on such cultural crossings". Sumita Mukherjee, in a review for the Journal of Colonialism and Colonial History, said "Fisher paints vivid character studies" in "a densely packed book about Mughal courts, British colonial society in the nineteenth century, global cosmopolitanism, British electoral politics, the law and lunacy".

=== Later life ===
Fisher's mother died in Blowing Rock, North Carolina, in 2014, having been predeceased by Fisher's father. Fisher retired from Oberlin College in 2016, and he and Richman moved to Wellfleet, Massachusetts, on Cape Cod, where her family has roots. He is on the Wellfleet Conservation Trust board of trustees and volunteers on the town's conservation commission.

In 2018, Cambridge University Press published his book An Environmental History of India: From Earliest Times to the Twenty-First Century. David Arnold, reviewing it for The English Historical Review, found "frustratingly little about the environment as such". He criticized Fisher's overemphasis on the political narrative – the personalities of rulers and the success or failure of state policies – "while ignoring or giving only passing attention to environmental crises and change."

== Published works ==
- Fisher, Michael Herbert (1987). A Clash of Cultures: Awadh, the British, and the Mughals. Riverdale, Maryland: The Riverdale Company. ISBN 978-0-913215-27-2.
- —— (1991). Indirect Rule in India: Residents and the Residency System, 1764-1858. Oxford University Press. ISBN 978-0-19-562676-6.
- ——, ed. (1993). The Politics of the British Annexation of India, 1757-1857. Oxford University Press. ISBN 978-0-19-563920-9.
- —— (1996). The First Indian Author in English: Dean Mahomed (1759-1851) in India, Ireland, and England. Oxford University Press. ISBN 978-0-19-565238-3.
- Mahomet, Sake Deen (1997). —— (ed.). The Travels of Dean Mahomet: An Eighteenth Century Journey through India. Berkeley: University of California Press. ISBN 978-0-520-20716-5.
- —— (2004). Counterflows to Colonialism: Indian Travellers and Settlers in Britain, 1600-1857. Delhi: Permanent Black. ISBN 978-81-7824-077-0.
- ——; Lahiri, Shompa; Thandi, Shinder S. (2007). A South Asian History of Britain: Four Centuries of Peoples from the Indian Subcontinent. Westport, Connecticut: Greenwood World Pub. ISBN 978-1-84645-008-2.
- ——, ed. (2007). Visions of Mughal India: An Anthology of European Travel Writing. I.B. Tauris. ISBN 978-1-84511-354-4.
- —— (2010). The Inordinately Strange Life of Dyce Sombre: Victorian Anglo Indian M.P. and Chancery 'Lunatic'. Columbia University Press. ISBN 978-0-231-70108-2.
- —— (2013). Migration: A World History. Oxford University Press. ISBN 978-0-19-935194-7.
- —— (2016). A Short History of the Mughal Empire. I.B.Tauris. ISBN 978-1-84885-873-2.
- —— (2018). An Environmental History of India: From Earliest Times to the Twenty-First Century. Cambridge University Press. ISBN 978-1-107-11162-2.
