= Karl von Vierordt =

German physiologist

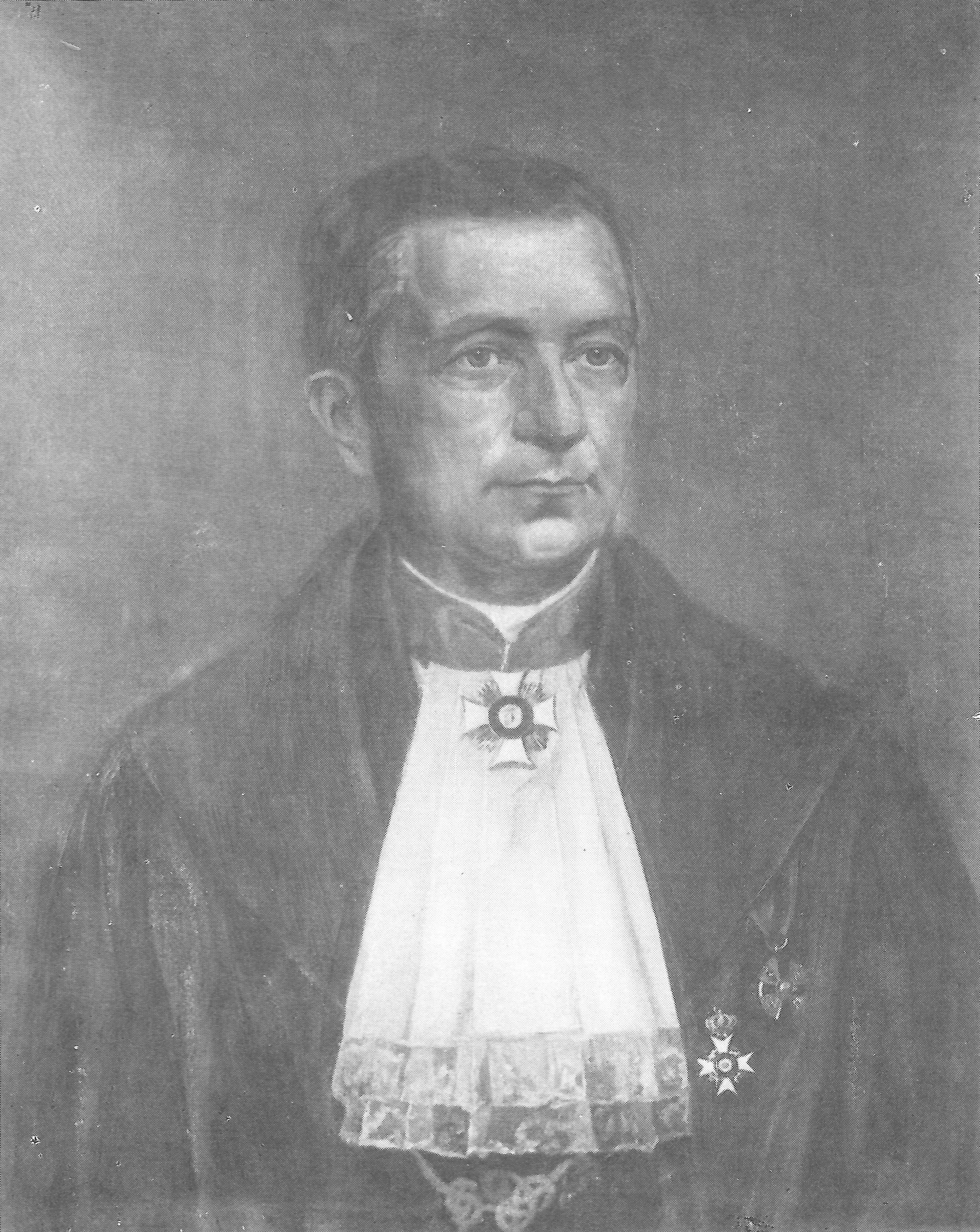
- Karl von Vierordt
- Born: July 1, 1818; Lahr, Baden
- Died: November 22, 1884 (aged 66); Tübingen
- Known for: sphygmograph
- Scientific career
- Fields: medicine
- Workplaces: University of Tübingen

Karl von Vierordt (July 1, 1818 – November 22, 1884) was a German physiologist.

Vierordt was born in Lahr, Baden. He studied at the universities of Berlin, Göttingen, Vienna, and Heidelberg, and began a practice in Karlsruhe in 1842. In 1849 he became a professor of theoretical medicine at the University of Tübingen, and in 1853 a professor of physiology.

Vierordt developed techniques and tools for the monitoring of blood circulation. He is credited with the construction of an early "hemotachometer", an apparatus for monitoring the velocity of blood flow. In 1854, he created a device called a sphygmograph, a mechanism consisting of weights and levers used to estimate blood pressure, and considered to be a forerunner of the modern sphygmomanometer. One of his better known written works was a treatise on the arterial pulse, titled Die Lehre vom Arterienpuls in gesunden und kranken Zuständen.

Vierordt also made substantial contributions to the psychology of time perception, via his book (published in 1868) Der Zeitsinn nach Versuchen, "The experimental study of the time sense". This reported a large number of experiments on the perception of duration, with the time sense being considered a "general sense" along with the perception of space, in contrast to the "special senses" such as vision and hearing. Included in this book is discussion of, and evidence for, what has come to be known as Vierordt's Law: roughly the proposition that short durations tend to be overestimated, while long durations tend to be underestimated.

Between these two extremes is a "point of indifference" where the "time sensation", in Vierordt's terminology, corresponds exactly to physical time. However, the 1868 book does much more than report this "law" and contains extensive discussions of different methods used to measure duration perception, as well as different sorts of errors that can occur.

Although Vierordt was not the first person to carry out experiments on time perception, his 1868 book involved much more extensive experimentation and discussion than had been carried out until then.

He died in Tübingen, aged 66.

== Contributions ==
Sphygmograph
