= Endovascular aneurysm repair =

Surgery used to treat abdominal aortic aneurysm

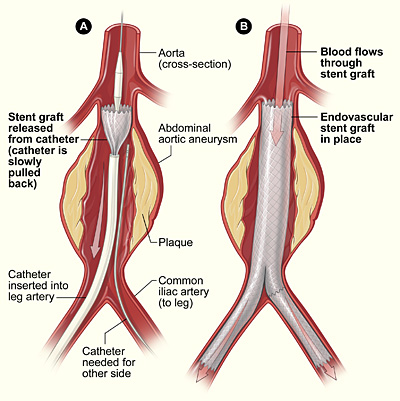
- Endovascular aneurysm repair
- Other names: Endovascular aortic repair
- ICD-9-CM: 39.51, 39.52, 39.7

Endovascular aneurysm repair (EVAR) is a type of minimally-invasive endovascular surgery used to treat pathology of the aorta, most commonly an abdominal aortic aneurysm (AAA). When used to treat thoracic aortic disease, the procedure is then specifically termed TEVAR for "thoracic endovascular aortic/aneurysm repair." EVAR involves the placement of an expandable stent graft within the aorta to treat aortic disease without operating directly on the aorta. In 2003, EVAR surpassed open aortic surgery as the most common technique for repair of AAA, and in 2010, EVAR accounted for 78% of all intact AAA repair in the United States.

== Medical uses ==
Standard EVAR is appropriate for aneurysms that begin below the renal arteries, where there exists an adequate length of normal aorta (the "proximal aortic neck") for reliable attachment of the endograft without leakage of blood around the device ("endoleak"). If the proximal aortic neck is also involved with the aneurysm, the patient may be a candidate for complex visceral EVAR with a fenestrated or branched EVAR.

Patients with aneurysms require elective repair of their aneurysm when it reaches a diameter large enough (typically greater than 5.5 cm) such that the risk of rupture is greater than the risk of surgery. Repair is also warranted for aneurysms that rapidly enlarge or those that have been the source of emboli (debris from the aneurysm that dislodges and travel into other arteries). Lastly, the repair is also indicated for aneurysms that are the source of pain and tenderness, which may indicate impending rupture. The options for repair include traditional open aortic surgery or endovascular repair.

Endovascular procedures aim to reduce the morbidity and mortality of treating arterial disease in a patient population that is increasingly older and less fit than when major open repairs were developed and popularized. Even in the early days, significant risks were accepted in the understanding that the large open operation was the only option. That is not the case in most patients today.

Studies that assign aneurysm patients to treatment with EVAR or traditional open surgery have demonstrated fewer early complications with the minimally invasive approach. Some studies have also observed a lower mortality rate with EVAR. The reduction in death, however, does not persist long-term. After a few years, the survival after repair is similar to EVAR or open surgery. This observation may be the result of durability problems with early endograft, with a corresponding need for additional procedures to repair endoleaks and other device-related issues. Newer, improved technology may reduce the need for such secondary procedures. If so, the results of EVAR may improve to the point where long-term survival benefit becomes evident.

EVAR is also used for rupture of the abdominal and descending thoracic aorta, and in rare cases used to treat pathology of the ascending aorta.

=== Aortic dissection ===
Endografts have been used in patients with aortic dissection, noting the extremely complex nature of open surgical repair in these patients. In uncomplicated aortic dissections, no benefit has been demonstrated over medical management alone. In uncomplicated type B aortic dissection, TEVAR does not seem either to improve or compromise 2-year survival and adverse event rates. Its use in complicated aortic dissection is under investigation. In the Clinical Practice Guidelines of the European Society for Vascular Surgery, it is recommended that in patients with complicated acute type B aortic dissection, endovascular repair with thoracic endografting should be the first line intervention.

Before people are deemed to be suitable candidates for this treatment, they have to go through a rigorous set of tests. These include a CT scan of the complete thorax/abdomen/pelvis and blood tests. The CT scan gives precise measurements of the aneurysm and the surrounding anatomy. In particular, the calibre/tortuosity of the iliac arteries and the relationship of the neck of the aneurysm to the renal arteries are important determinants of whether the aneurysm is amenable to endoluminal repair. In certain occasions where the renal arteries are too close to the aneurysm, the custom-made fenestrated graft stent is now an accepted alternative to doing open surgery.

== Relative contraindications ==
A patient's anatomy can be unsuitable for EVAR in several ways. Most commonly, in an infrarenal aneurysm, a potential EVAR candidate lacks adequate length of the normal-diameter aorta between the aneurysm and the takeoff of the renal arteries, the "infra-renal neck". Another relative contraindications include prohibitively small iliac arteries, aneurysmal iliac arteries, prohibitively small femoral arteries, or circumferential calcification of the femoral or iliac arteries.

In addition to a short proximal aortic neck, the neck may be angulated, large in diameter, or shaped like a funnel (conical) where the neck diameter at the top is larger than the neck diameter at the bottom. Along with a short proximal aortic neck, necks with any of these characteristics are called "hostile necks" and endovascular repair can be either contraindicated or associated with early-late complications of endoleak, or endograft migration, or both.

Many of the advances in EVAR technique aim to adapt EVAR for these situations, and advanced techniques allow EVAR to be employed in patients who previously were not candidates.

== Technique ==
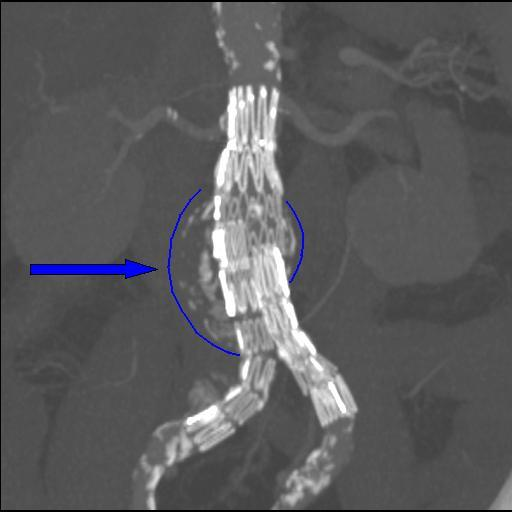
Abdominal aortic endograft on a CT scan; original aneurysm marked in blue

The procedure is carried out in a sterile environment under fluoroscopic guidance. It is usually carried out by a vascular surgeon, interventional radiologist or cardiac surgeon, and occasionally, general surgeon or interventional cardiologist. The procedure can be performed under general, regional (spinal or epidural) or even local anesthesia.

Access to the patient's femoral arteries can be with surgical incisions or percutaneously in the groin on both sides. Vascular sheaths are introduced into the patient's femoral arteries, through which guidewires, catheters, and the endograft are passed.

Diagnostic angiography images are captured of the aorta to determine the location of the patient's renal arteries, so the stent-graft can be deployed without blocking these. Failure to achieve this will cause kidney failure. With most devices, the "main body" of the endograft is placed first, followed by the "limbs" which join the main body and extend to the iliac arteries, effectively protecting the aneurysm sac from blood pressure.

The abdominal aneurysm extends down to the common iliac arteries in about 25%-30% of patients. In such cases, the iliac limbs can be extended into the external iliac artery to bypass a common iliac aneurysm. Alternatively, a specially designed endograft, (an iliac branch device) can be used to preserve flow to the internal iliac arteries. The preservation of the hypogastric (internal iliac) arteries is important to prevent buttock claudication and impotence, and every effort should be made to preserve flow to at least one hypogastric artery.

The endograft acts as an artificial lumen for blood to flow through, protecting the surrounding aneurysm sac. This reduces the pressure in the aneurysm, which itself will usually thrombose and shrink in size over time.

Staging such procedures is common, particularly to address aortic branch points near the diseased aortic segment. One example in the treatment of thoracic aortic disease is revascularization of the left common carotid artery and/or the left subclavian artery from the innominate artery or the right common carotid artery to allow treatment of a thoracic aortic aneurysm that encroaches proximally into the aortic arch. These "extra-anatomic bypasses" can be performed without an invasive thoracotomy. Another example in the abdominal aorta is the embolization of the internal iliac artery on one side prior to coverage by an iliac limb device. Continued improvement in stent-graft design, including branched endografts, will reduce but not eliminate multi-stage procedures.

=== Percutaneous EVAR ===
Standard EVAR involves a surgical cut-down on either the femoral or iliac arteries, with the creation of a 4–6 cm incision. Like many surgical procedures, EVAR has advanced to a more minimally invasive technique, by accessing the femoral arteries percutaneously In percutaneous EVAR (PEVAR), small, sub-centimeter incisions are made over the femoral artery, and endovascular techniques are used to place the device over a wire. Percutaneous EVAR has been systematically compared to the standard EVAR cut-down femoral artery approach. Moderate quality evidence suggests that there are no differences in short-term mortality, aneurysm sealing, long and short-term complications, or infections at the wound site. Higher quality evidence suggests that there are no differences in post-repair bleeding complications or haematoma between the two approaches. The percutaneous approach may have reduced surgical time.

=== Fenestrated EVAR ===
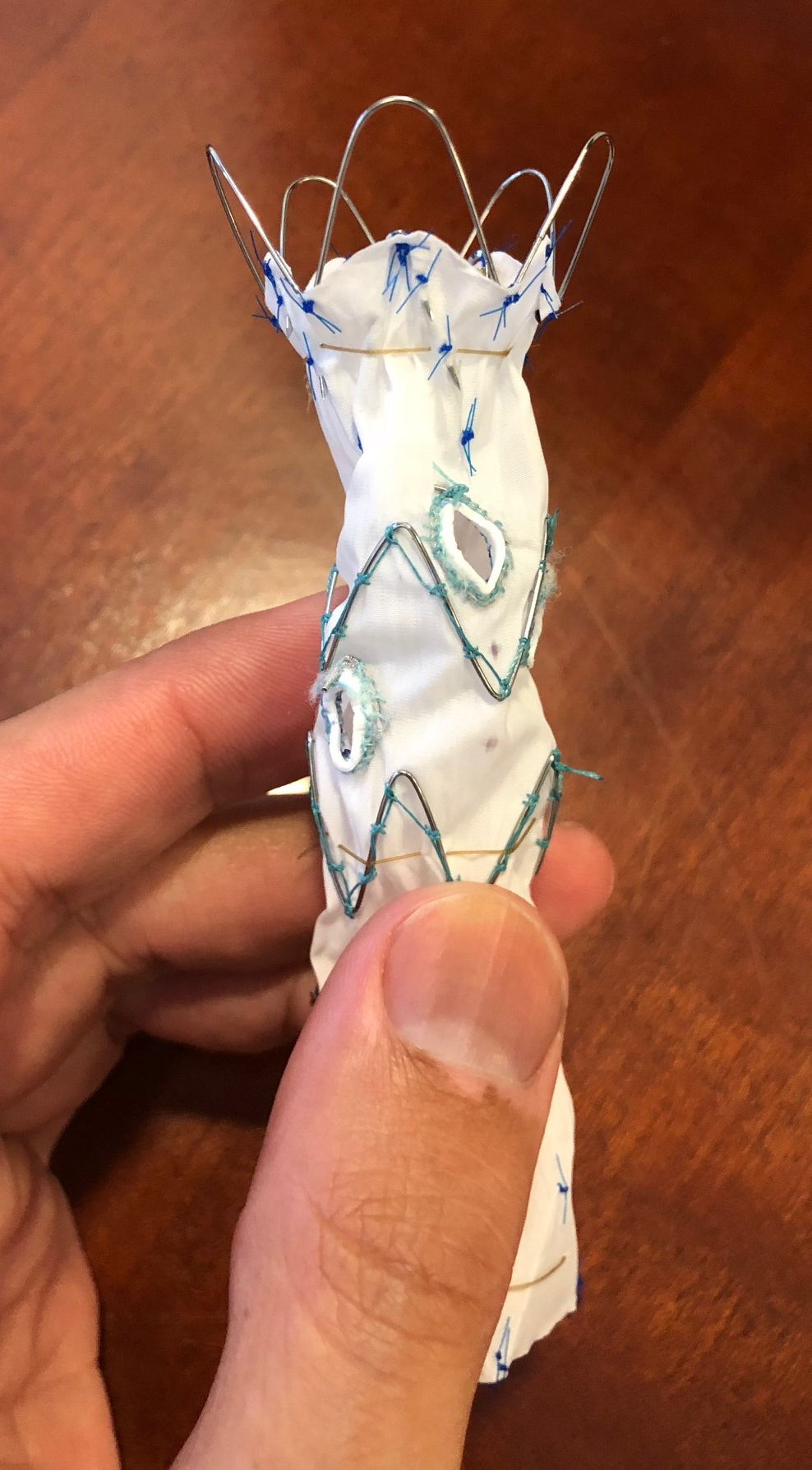
An example of a physician-modified aortic endograft with fenestrations added to accommodate the visceral branch arteries

Fenestrated endovascular aortic/aneurysm repair (FEVAR) is performed in the cases where the aneurysm extends near or involves the visceral vessels (such as juxta-renal, para-renal, thoraco-abdominal aortic aneurysms). A custom-made graft with fenestrations (holes on the graft body to maintain the patency of the visceral arteries) is used for the procedure. When the aneurysm involves the visceral arteries, standard EVAR is contraindicated due to the lack of suitable infra-aortic segment for the endograft attachment; FEVAR achieves seal between the stent graft and para-visceral segment and/or more proximal segment while preserving the flow of the visceral arteries. FEVAR has been in use in the United Kingdom for over a decade and early results were published in Jun 2012.

=== Branched EVAR ===
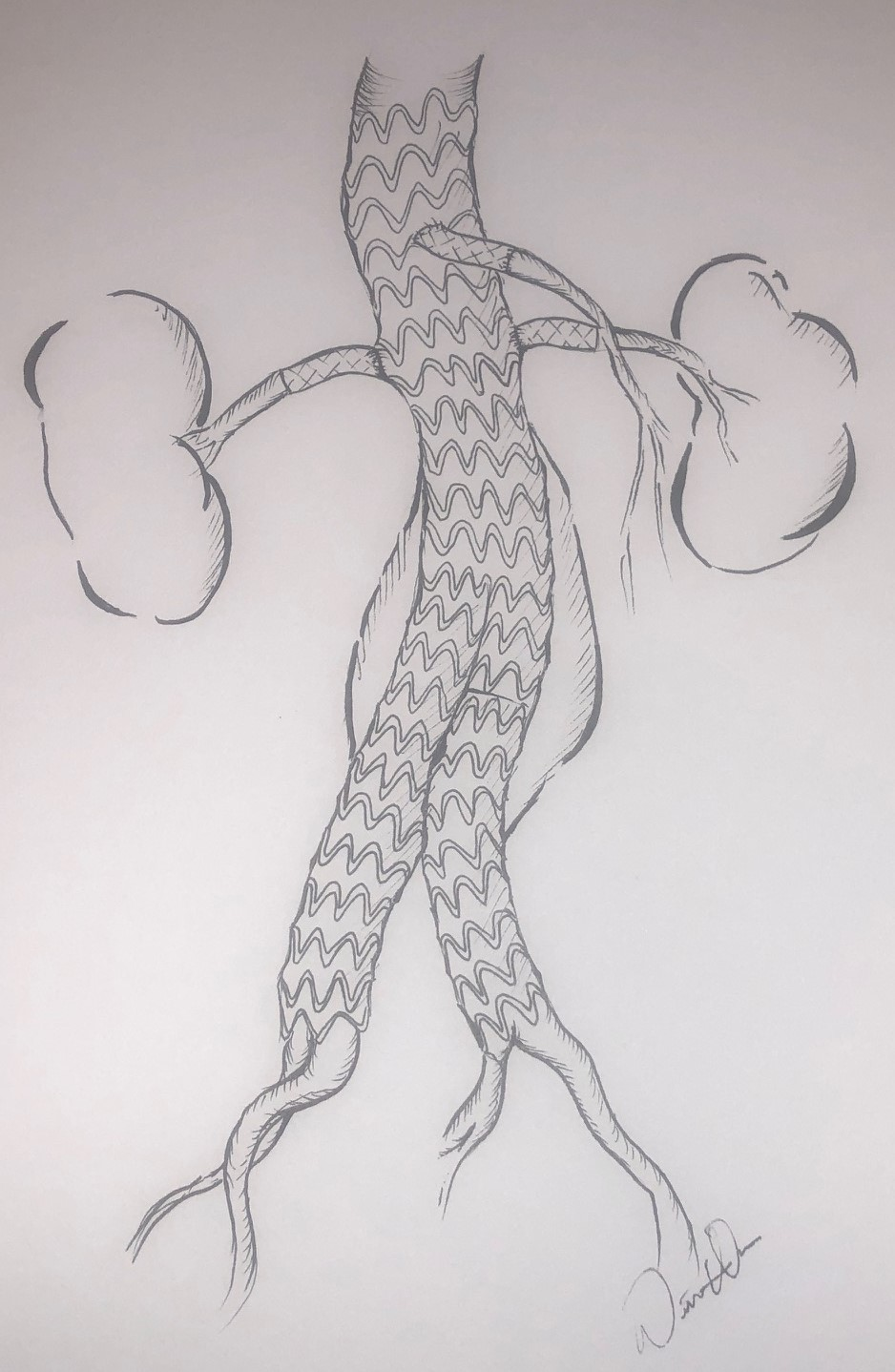
Artist's rendering of a branched/fenestrated EVAR in the visceral segment of the aorta above an abdominal aortic aneurysm

Thoracoabdominal aortic aneurysms (TAAA) involve the aorta in the chest and abdomen. As such, major branch arteries to the head, arms, spinal cord, intestines, and kidneys may originate from the aneurysm. An endovascular repair of a TAAA is only possible if blood flow to these critical arteries is preserved. Hybrid procedures offer one option, but a more direct approach involves the use of a branched endograft. However, the complex anatomy associated with the supra-aortic vessels is particularly difficult to accommodate with branched endograft devices. Dr. Timothy Chuter pioneered this approach, with a completely endovascular solution. After partial deployment of the main body of an endograft, separate endograft limbs are deployed from the main body to each major aortic branch. This procedure is long, technically difficult, and currently only performed in a few centers.

When the aneurysm begins above the renal arteries, neither fenestrated endografts nor "EndoAnchoring" of an infrarenal endograft is useful (an open surgical repair may be necessary). Alternatively, a "branched" endograft may be used. A branched endograft has graft limbs that branch off of the main portion of the device to directly provide blood flow to the kidneys or the visceral arteries.

=== Hybrid procedures ===
On occasion, there is inadequate length or quality of the proximal or distal aortic neck. In these cases, a fully minimally invasive option is not possible. One solution, however, is a hybrid repair, which combines an open surgical bypass with EVAR or TEVAR. In hybrid procedures, the endograft is positioned over major aortic branches. While such a position would normally cause problems from disruption of blood flow to the covered branches (renal, visceral, or branches to the head or arms), the prior placement of bypass grafts to these critical vessels allowed the deployment of the endograft at a level that would otherwise not be possible.

If a patient has calcified or narrow femoral arteries that prohibit the introduction of the endograft transfemorally, an iliac conduit may be used. This is typically a piece of PTFE that is sewn directly to the iliac arteries, which are exposed via an open retroperitoneal approach. The endograft is then introduced into the aorta through the conduit.

In patients with thoracic aortic disease involving the arch and descending aorta, it is not always possible to perform a completely endovascular repair. This is because head vessels of the aortic arch supplying blood to the brain cannot be covered and for this reason, there is often an inadequate landing zone for stent-graft delivery. A hybrid repair strategy offers a reasonable choice for treating such patients. A commonly used hybrid repair procedure is the "frozen elephant trunk repair". This technique involves midline sternotomy. The aortic arch is transected and the stent-graft device is delivered in an ante-grade fashion in the descending aorta. The aortic arch is subsequently reconstructed and the proximal portion of the stent-graft device is then directly sutured into the surgical graft. Patients with anomalies of the arch and some disease extension into the descending aorta are often ideal candidates. Studies have reported successful use of hybrid techniques for treating Kommerell diverticulum and descending aneurysms in patients with previous coarctation repairs.

In addition, hybrid techniques combining both open and endovascular repair are also used in managing emergency complications in the aortic arch, such as retrograde ascending dissection and endoleaks from previous stent grafting of descending aorta. A "reverse frozen elephant trunk repair" is shown to be particularly effective.

=== Adjunctive procedures ===
- Snorkel: A covered stent placed into a visceral vessel adjacent to the main body of the EVAR device. The aortic lumen of the visceral stent is directed superiorly, resembling a snorkel.
- Chimney: In TEVAR, a covered stent placed from the ascending aorta to a great vessel (e.g., innominate artery) and adjacent to the main body of the EVAR is termed a chimney. In anatomic position, blood flows superiorly through a chimney-stent graft into the great vessel, just as smoke flows up a chimney.
- Periscope: Like a snorkel, a periscope stent graft provides flow to a visceral vessel, but in a retrograde fashion, with the aortic lumen inferior to the main body of the EVAR device.
- Stents: Large bare-metal stents have been used to treat proximal endoleaks, as have aortic extension cuffs to treat endograft migration.
- Glue: Trans-catheter embolic glue has been used to treat type I endoleaks, with inconsistent success.
- EndoAnchors: Small, helically shaped devices are screwed through the endograft and into the aortic wall. EndoAnchors have been used successfully to treat endoleaks and, in concert with an aortic extension endograft, to treat migration of the original endograft. Rigorous evaluations and long-term outcomes of this technique are not yet available.

== Risks ==
The complications of EVAR can be divided into those that are related to the repair procedure and those related to the endograft device. For example, a myocardial infarction that occurs immediately after the repair is normally related to the procedure and not the device. By contrast, the development of an endoleak from degeneration of endograft fabric would be a device-related complication.

Durability and problems such as 'endoleaks' may require careful surveillance and adjuvant procedures to ensure the success of the EVAR or EVAR/hybrid procedure. CT angiography (CTA) imaging has, in particular, made a key contribution to planning, success, durability in this complex area of vascular surgery.

A major cause of complications in EVAR is the failure of the seal between the proximal, infra-renal aneurysm neck and the endovascular graft. Risk of this form of failure is especially elevated in adverse or challenging proximal neck anatomies, where this seal could be compromised by unsuitable geometric fit between the graft and vessel wall, as well as instability of the anatomy. New recent techniques have been introduced to address these risks by utilizing a segment of the supra-renal portion of the aorta to increase the sealing zone, such as with fenestrated EVAR, chimneys and snorkels. These techniques may be suitable in certain patients with qualifying factors, e.g., configuration of renal arteries, renal function. However, these are more complex procedures than standard EVAR and may be subject to further complications.

An approach that directly augments the fixation and sealing between the graft and aorta to mimic the stability of a surgical anastomosis is EndoAnchoring. EndoAnchors are small, helically shaped implants that directly lock the graft to the aortic wall with the goal to prevent complications of the seal, especially in adverse neck anatomies. These EndoAnchors may also be used to treat identified leaks between the graft and proximal neck.

=== Procedure-related ===
Arterial dissection, contrast-induced kidney failure, thrombosis or embolization, ischemic colitis, groin hematoma, wound infection, myocardial infarction, congestive heart failure, cardiac arrhythmias, respiratory failure.

=== Device-related ===
Endograft migration, aneurysm rupture, graft limb stenosis/kinking, type I/III/IV endoleaks, stent graft thrombosis, or infection. Device infection occurs in 1-5% of aortic prosthesis placements and is a life-threatening complication.

=== Endoleaks ===
An endoleak is a leak into the aneurysm sac after endovascular repair. Five types of endoleaks exist:

- Type I - Perigraft leakage at proximal or distal graft attachment sites (near the renal and iliac arteries)
- Type II - Retrograde flow to the aneurysm sac from branches such as the lumbar and inferior mesenteric arteries. Type II endoleaks are the most common, and least serious type of endoleak. Type II endoleaks do not require immediate treatment, as a portion will resolve spontaneously.
- Type III - Leakage between overlapping parts of the stent (i.e., the connection between overlapping components) or rupture through graft material.
- Type IV - Leakage through the graft wall due to the quality (porosity) of the graft material. As seen in first-generation grafts, changes in graft material in modern devices have decreased the prevalence of type IV leaks.
- Type V - Expansion of the aneurysm sac without an identifiable leak. Also called "endotension".

Type I and III leaks are considered high-pressure leaks and are more concerning than other leak types. Depending on the aortic anatomy, they may require further intervention to treat. Type II leaks are common and often can be left untreated unless the aneurysm sac continues to expand after EVAR.

=== Spinal cord injury ===
Spinal cord injury is a devastating complication after aortic surgery, specifically for thoracoabdominal aortic aneurysm repair; severe injury could lead to urine and fecal incontinence, paresthesia and even paraplegia. The risk varies between studies with two metanalysis demonstrating a pooled incidence of spinal cord injury 2.2% and 11%. Predictive factors include increasing extent of coverage, hypogastric artery occlusion, prior aortic repair and perioperative hypotension. Spinal cord injury related to aortic repair occurs due to impaired blood flow to the spine after coverage of blood vessels, important to the blood circulation of the spine, namely intercostal- and lumbar arteries. Neuromonitoring appears to be effective in detecting perioperative spinal cord injury risk during TEVAR. While the incidence of spinal cord injury remains variable, identification of risk factors may guide clinical decisions, particularly in high-risk procedures. A few methods exist for potentially reversing spinal cord injury, if it arises, elevated blood pressure, increased oxygenation, blood transfusion and cerebrospinal fluid drainage.

=== Cerebrospinal fluid drainage ===
Cerebrospinal fluid drainage is one of the adjunct methods used to reverse spinal cord injury. With increased drainage of spinal fluid, the intrathecal pressure decreases which allows for increase blood perfusion to the spine, possibly reversing the ischemic injury of the spinal tissue due to lessened blood supply. The benefits of this procedure have been established in open aortic repair and suggested in endovascular aortic repair.

== Recovery after EVAR ==
As compared to the traditional aortic repair, standard recovery after EVAR is faster with earlier ambulation. Patients who have undergone EVAR typically spend one night in the hospital to be monitored, although it has been suggested that EVAR can be performed as a same-day procedure.

Patients are advised to slowly return to normal activity. There are no specific activity restrictions after EVAR, however, patients typically are seen by their surgeon within one month after EVAR to begin post-EVAR surveillance.

There is limited research looking at patients' experience of recovery after more complex and staged EVAR for thoracoabdominal aortic diseases. One qualitative study found that patients with complex aortic diseases struggle with physical and psychological setbacks, continuing years after their operations.

In a systematic review of published clinical case reports analyzing causes for partial or complete explantation, with an emphasis on infection extent, incorporated branch management, reconstruction, and staging, patients were aged 51–78 years (median, 73), and nine were men. Infection prompted eight explantations; renal chimney-stent thrombosis with type Ia endoleak and persistent type II endoleak with sac enlargement accounted for two mechanical failures. Eight patients underwent complete and two partial explantations. Nine survived the index hospitalization. No recurrent infection was reported during the available, heterogeneous follow-up of 3–48 months.

== History ==
Dr. Juan C. Parodi introduced the minimally-invasive endovascular aneurysm repair (EVAR) to the world and performed the first successful endovascular repair of an abdominal aortic aneurysm on 7 September 1990 in Buenos Aires on a friend of Carlos Menem, the then President of Argentina. The first device was simple, according to Parodi: "It was a graft I designed with expandable ends, the extra-large Palmaz stent, a Teflon sheath with a valve, a wire, and the valvuloplasty balloon, which I took from the cardiologists." Parodi's first patient lived for nine years after the procedure and died from pancreatic cancer. The first EVAR performed in the United States was in 1992 by Drs. Frank Veith, Michael Marin, Juan Parodi and Claudio Schonholz at Montefiore Medical Center affiliated with Albert Einstein College of Medicine.

The modern endovascular device used to repair abdominal aortic aneurysms, which is bifurcated and modular, was pioneered and first employed by Dr. Timothy Chuter while a fellow at the University of Rochester. The first clinical series of his device was published from Nottingham in 1994. The first endovascular repair of a ruptured abdominal aortic aneurysm was also reported from Nottingham in 1994.

By 2003, four devices were on the market in the United States. Each of these devices has since been either abandoned or further refined to improve its characteristics in vivo.

== Special populations ==
=== Women ===
Women are known to have smaller aortas on average than men, so are potential candidates for AAA treatment at smaller maximum aneurysm diameters than men.

=== Transplant candidates ===
As immunosuppressive medications are known to increase the rate of aneurysm growth, transplant candidates are AAA repair candidates at smaller maximum aneurysm diameters than the general population.

== Other animals ==
Due to the expense associated with EVAR stent-graft devices and their specificity to human aortic anatomy, EVAR is not used in other animals.

== Videos ==
Stenting of coarctation of the aorta using TEVAR

EVAR placement in the abdominal aorta
