= David Boyd (surgeon) =

American surgeon (born 1937)

David R. Boyd
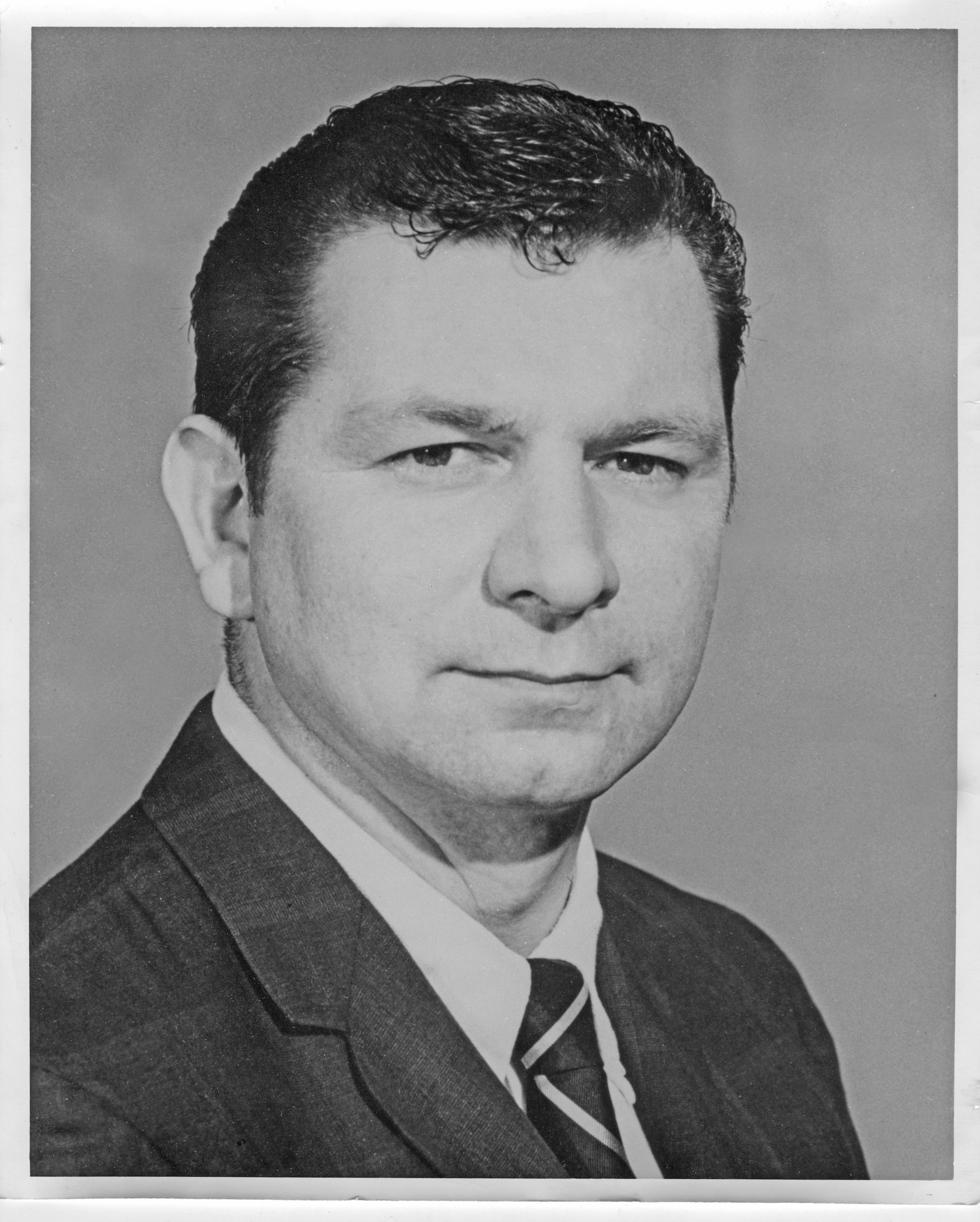
- Born: February 2, 1937 (age 89); Seattle, Washington
- Education: Central Washington College; McGill University
- Years active: 1963–2013
- Spouse(s): Joyce Moore Boyd, MD, MPH

David R. Boyd (born February 2, 1937) was an American surgeon and pioneer in emergency medicine. Boyd is considered to be one of the later fathers of EMS systems." His colleague John Otten noted that Boyd "had been responsible for saving thousands of lives - more than anyone in the medical profession."

== Early life and family ==
Boyd was born and raised in Seattle, Washington. He graduated from Roosevelt High School, where he played quarterback and was captain of the famous "No score in '54" football team. He attended Central Washington University with the intention of becoming a teacher, but changed his major to psychology in preparation for medical school. Boyd attended medical school at McGill University, where he met his wife, Joyce Moore Boyd, a fellow physician. Together, they had four children.

Continuing his education, Boyd completed a rotating internship at Cook County Hospital. After serving two years as Chief Medical Officer during the Vietnam War, Boyd entered the General Surgery Program at the University of Maryland. While there, he studied under the surgeon R Adams Cowley, a pioneer in emergency medicine and the treatment of shock trauma. Boyd became the first student to do a fellowship at the R Adams Cowley Shock Trauma Center, where he was introduced to shock trauma. His studies of shock trauma under Cowley led to the development of his EMS System.

== Career ==
Boyd developed a "trauma unit" concept at Cook County Hospital, which used a combination of monitoring, resuscitation, and immediate surgery, helping to establish the modern emergency medical system. Under his oversight, Boyd's local program developed into the standard system in the State of Illinois, and eventually expanded into a national program. In 1972, Boyd was appointed by President Gerald Ford to be the Director of EMS Systems for the federal government, responsible for expanding the program to every state and four US territories.

Later in life, Boyd privately consulted with hospitals concerning trauma and EMS systems locally, domestically and internationally. He also returned to clinical medicine by joining the Indian Health Service as a surgeon for the Sioux and Blackfeet Tribes. Boyd has published over 150 articles and papers in his field of expertise and has written chapters in medical textbooks on EMS. Through Boyd's influence, terms such as "trauma registry", "trauma center," "EMS systems," and "first responder" became well known. In 2015, Boyd was invited to write a professional autobiography in the Journal of Trauma and Acute Care Surgery about his role in shaping the trauma/EMS system nationally and globally, entitled "A trauma surgeon's journey."

== Emergency medical services (EMS) systems ==
Boyd developed a national EMS system by first creating a local trauma unit system in Cook County, Illinois, then expanding the system to the State of Illinois, and finally nationally through a series of plans for individual states. He also designated statewide specialty trauma centers for burns, spinal cord injuries, and pediatrics in Chicago. Boyd joined the Cook County Trauma Unit in 1968 as the Resident Director of Research and Operation. He noticed inconsistencies in the records, and developed plans such as an NIH computerized trauma registry to help collect and store data to streamline the trauma system. Governor Richard B. Ogilvie of Illinois reached out to Boyd and asked him to publish his data from the trauma unit for a state-wide plan, where Boyd was brought in to administer the implementation of the plan. Boyd developed a system of 40 new trauma centers and designated nine administrative regions in the state. Additionally, he created a three-tiered system that would expedite and standardize emergency services in Illinois. During his time at the state, Boyd testified before the United States Congress in support of a National EMS Plan.

In 1973, the Emergency Medical Services Act was passed in Congress, and Boyd was appointed by Ford to be the Director of the Division of EMS Systems. Boyd was tasked with developing state-wide programs for all 50 states and four territories. Boyd visited states and identified areas where it made social and geographic sense to develop trauma centers in a variety of sizes and uses. Boyd implemented his plan by requiring states to qualify for federal assistance in order to be granted federal funding for their systems. Boyd asserted that qualifying states must have plans that are sufficiently comprehensive by setting up a guideline with fifteen components, including access to care, critical care units, coordinated patient record keeping, and transportation. He hosted a White House conference to explain the national program to the states. Cardiology expert Mark Vasu has said about Boyd's EMS program: "Prior to Dave's program, there was virtually no training, no standards, no 'system' of emergency care in this country." The program was terminated by President Ronald Reagan in the early 1980s at the federal level, but Boyd's work is continued to this day at the local and state levels.

After expanding his program nationally, Boyd entered the private sector as a consultant. He advised many domestic hospitals and foreign governments, such as Japan, Egypt, and Canada. In Quebec, Canada, the EMS System was referred to as "le model du Boyd". His main obstacle was transposing the American system into differently structured countries in Europe, Asia, and the Middle East in an effective and comprehensive way.

== Indian Health Service ==
Later in his career, Boyd returned to clinical medicine and worked in trauma and general surgery at the Blackfeet Reservation in Montana and in other Native American communities. He became the medical director in the Blackfeet Tribe and re-organized the ambulance and visiting consultant system to improve medical care and response time. Boyd then became the National Director of Trauma and EMS for the Indian Health Service, based in Rockville, Maryland. He worked to link rural hospitals to regional EMS systems so that more specialized care could be given if needed. This included a "Teletrauma" system, where CT scans could be sent from rural areas to remote doctors via the internet. This expanded the care available to rural and native peoples.

Additionally, Boyd campaigned to decrease alcohol deaths in tribes, where he organized personnel to assist with alcohol-related accidents on tribal land. With respect to his service to Native Americans, it was said that his most cherished recognition was to be honored by the Blackfeet Nation with the name Pita Ana ("Eagle Man").
