= William Muller =

William Muller may refer to:

- William H. Muller Jr. (1919–2012), American cardiologist
- William Grenfell Max Muller (1867–1945), British diplomat
- William James Müller (1812–1845), also spelt Muller, British landscape and figure painter
- Bill Muller (c. 1964–2007), American journalist and film critic

== See also ==
- Wilhelm Müller (disambiguation)
