= ThermaHelm =

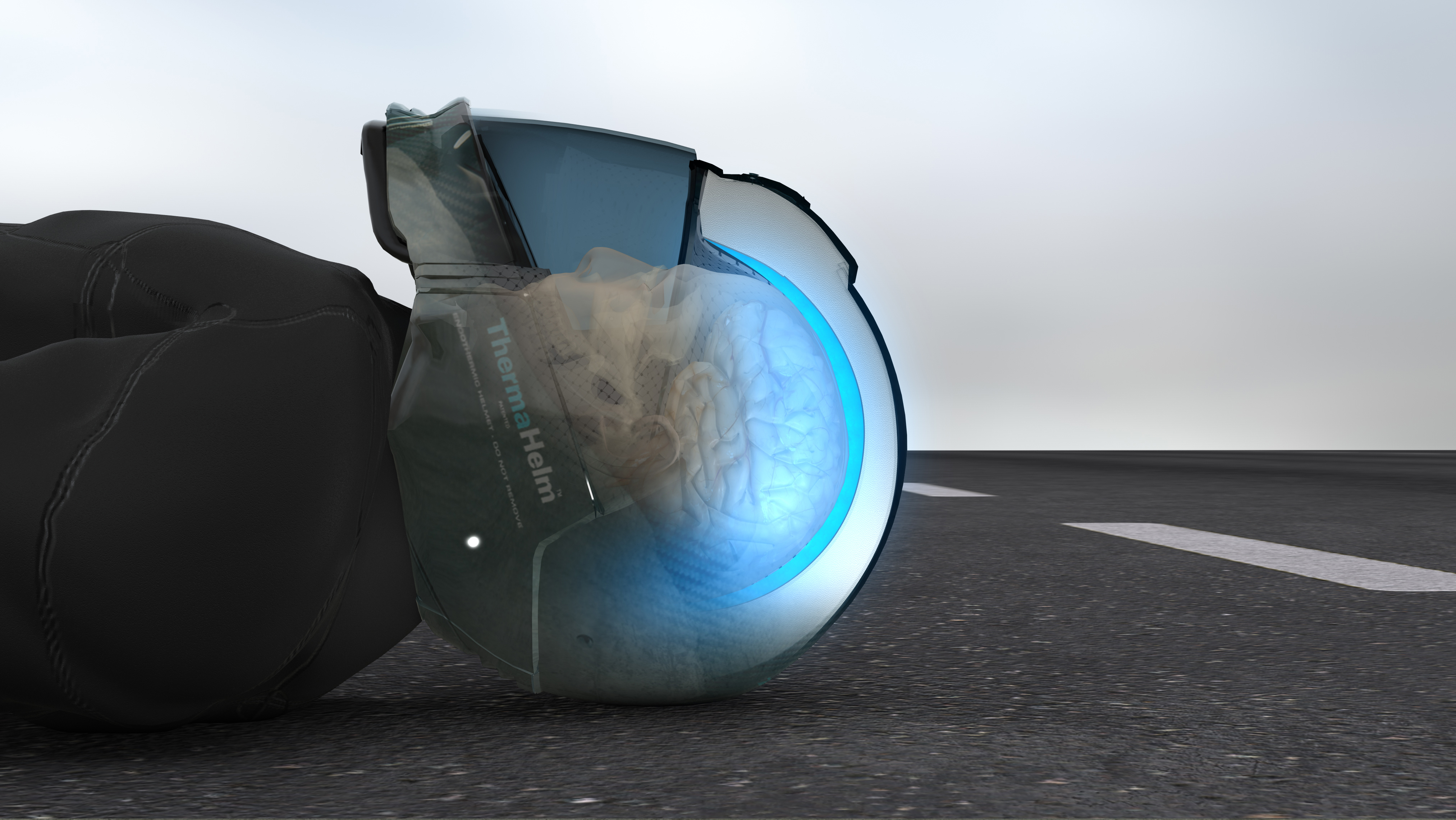
ThermaHelm's Halo brain cooling motorcycle helmet

Halo Active (previously ThermaHelm) is an impact-activated brain cooling motorcycle crash helmet invented in 2008 by Jullian Joshua Preston-Powers.

Ammonium nitrate and water and other proprietary chemicals, stored in separate areas of the helmet's liner, combine when trigger activated by an impact to create an endothermic reaction to prevent brain swelling, and reduce the effects of traumatic brain injury, a major cause of death and disability worldwide. When activated by a sudden impact, the helmet performs like an instant ice pack that immediately initiates a cooling effect. This cooling process lasts approximately 30 to 45 minutes and helps to control swelling, extending protection of vital neurological function during the Golden hour prior to hospital arrival.

Richard Phillips, former decade-long Managing Director of the world-famous Silverstone race circuit, assisted the Halo project in 2015 and 2016 along with digital agency support by Mark Cornwell, CEO of HPS Group in Marlow. Tom Walker, former MD motorcycle accessories retailer Hein Gericke, joined the development team in 2017.

Dr Henry Wang, a researcher at the University of Illinois College of Medicine at Peoria, "lives in hope for a day when a pre-hospital cooling head cover will be available to those with head injury or stroke".

In December 2015, identySOL entered final stages of design to develop and supply the helmet with Halocator GPS tracking units.
