= Juan C. Parodi =

Argentinian vascular surgeon

Juan Carlos Parodi (Buenos Aires, August 16, 1942) is an Argentinian vascular surgeon who introduced the minimally invasive endovascular aneurysm repair (EVAR) to the world and performed the first successful endovascular repair of an abdominal aortic aneurysm on 7 September 1990 in Buenos Aires. In 1992 he was the first in the United States to perform minimally invasive aortic aneurysm surgery (stent graft procedure) together with Drs. Frank Veith, Michael L. Marin and Claudio J. Schonholz. He continues to develop new techniques, including seat belt and air bag technique for cerebral protection during carotid stenting. He is recognized as a renowned pioneer in the specialty of endovascular repairs of the aorta.

Juan Parodi is also a political activist and defender of measures to alleviate poverty as well as promoter of the concept of responsible procreation and education of the most economically affected sectors in Argentina.

== Biography ==
Juan Parodi was led to a career in surgery through his own interest and family influence - his uncle was a surgeon. In 1960 he began his medical training at the Universidad del Salvador, Buenos Aires, Argentina. After receiving an MD degree at the University of Salvador in 1968, Juan Parodi entered the general surgery residency in the former M. Castex Hospital which he finished in 1972. He did postgraduate fellowship at the University of Illinois at Chicago and following it did another one at the Cleveland Clinic with emphasis on vascular surgery. From 1975 to 1976 Parodi served as chief resident at the Cleveland Clinic, where Professor Alfred Humphries and Edwin Beven became two significant mentors in his career. It was during that last year 1976 that he committed all his wits to develop a new minimally invasive surgical technique that would change the future of the then infant specialty of vascular surgery and in particular aortic aneurysm surgery.

The conception of Parodi's new minimally invasive technique started in 1976. It was aimed at excluding an aneurysm using a fabric graft and metal components to affix and seal these elements in position using an endovascular retrograde access. At that time, the term “metal cage with barbs” was used rather than “stent”. The engineering of the first prototypes using elastic wires of stainless steel and the experimental work took place at the Cleveland Clinic, USA.

In 1979 he returned to Argentina where he continued working on the improvement of his minimally invasive surgical techniques. At that time, nobody paid attention to Parodi’s invention, which he continued to research without funding. By the mid 1980s, Parodi was having some success with his new technique in animal experiments. In 1988, Parodi met Argentinian radiologist Julio Palmaz, the inventor of the Palmaz stent, and Parodi began to use Palmaz stents in combination with his endografts on animals. From 1976 to 1990, Parodi did not receive any funding or support for his project.

On 7 September 1990 Parodi made vascular surgery history with the first successful endograft procedure in the world, in the city of Buenos Aires. The first human being to be treated with Parodi’s endograft was fairly high profile – a friend of Carlos Menem, the then President of Argentina also a patient who received an intervención bring presidente with a team of doctor Alejandro Tfeli and Luis de la Fuente. The first device was simple, according to Parodi: “It was a graft I designed with expandable ends, the extra-large Palmaz stent, a Teflon sheath with a valve, a wire, and the valvuplasty balloon, which I took from the cardiologists." Juan Parodi invited Julio Palmaz to participate in the case at the Instituto Cardiovascular de Buenos Aires. That case was a turning point in the history of vascular surgery, changing the way most patients with aneurysmal disease are treated around the world today.

Despite the high profile of the patient, the procedure had little initial impact on the vascular surgery community because his initial results were rejected by the journal he submitted to. Finally in 1991 through the Annals of Vascular Surgery, the case by Juan C Parodi and Julio Palmaz became the first widely known endovascular repair (EVAR) of the aorta. In October 1992 the first EVAR case in Western Europe was done by Parodi, Claude Mialhe, Claude Amicabile and Claudio Schonholz in Nancy, France, and the second case was in 1994, in Roma, Italy, with his friend Luis de la Fuente. In November 1992 Parodi was the first in the United States to perform minimally invasive aortic aneurysm surgery together with Frank Veith, Michael Marin and Claudio Schonholz. In 1995, the EVAR procedure was published in the Journal of Vascular Surgery. In 2005, Juan Parodi was celebrated as the creator of the Parodi Endograft, "one of the biggest innovations in the history of vascular surgery".

When he became a professor in 1993 at Universidad del Salvador, Buenos Aires, he began traveling throughout the United States and abroad. He was a visiting professor at Stanford, New York, the University of London and the University of Tokyo. He also was an honorary professor at his alma mater, University of Buenos Aires and was a professor of surgery at Wake Forest University and Washington University in St. Louis. He is adjunct surgical research professor, University of Michigan, USA.

In conjunction with the Research Chair at the University of Michigan, he undertook a work on the Argentine demographic growth, evaluating the projection of human quality in the coming years and with this base, he spoke at several conferences, which became very famous for making emphasis on the problems that hit your country hard, such as poverty and the poor education that this sector receives in Argentina.

In 1980, Juan Parodi removed a gangrenous gall bladder from a poor Argentinian priest and did it without any payment. Years later, he found out who that poor priest was, Jorge Bergoglio. In 2014, Parodi and his wife was invited to visit that priest, now Pope Francis, at the Vatican and to be thanked for caring for another person without compensation.

== Awards and others ==
- 2000 Best inventor (Erasmo University of Rotterdam)
- 2002 Jacobson Innovation Award (American College of Surgeons).
- 2003 Konex Award 2003: Surgery
- 2006 Society for Vascular Surgery (SVS) Medal for Innovation - the very first SVS Medal of Innovation.
- 2009 Grand Master of Endovascular Surgery.
- 2012 Doctor Honoris Cause of Genova University
- 2020 Society for Vascular Surgery (SVS) International Lifetime Achievement Award
- 2023 Konex Award - Special Mention for his career (Konex Fundation in Argentina)

== Memberships ==
- Member of the American Society for Vascular Surgery
- Member of the European Society for Vascular Surgery.
- Fellow of the American College of Surgeons.
- Honorary member of the Salvador University of Buenos Aires.
- Honorary member of the German Society of Surgery.
- Honorary member of the Greek Surgery Society.
- Member of the Irish Society of Surgery.
- Member of the Italian Society of Surgery.
- Konex Foundation, Juan Carlos Parodi, Premio Cirugia 2003.
