= Trauma center =

Type of hospital

A trauma center, or trauma centre, is a hospital equipped and staffed to provide care for patients suffering from major traumatic injuries such as falls, motor vehicle collisions, or gunshot wounds. The term "trauma center" may be used incorrectly to refer to an emergency department (also known as a "casualty department" or "accident and emergency") that lacks the presence of specialized services or certification to care for victims of major trauma.

In the United States, a hospital can receive trauma center status by meeting specific criteria established by the American College of Surgeons (ACS) and passing a site review by the Verification Review Committee. Official designation as a trauma center is determined by individual state law provisions. Trauma centers vary in their specific capabilities and are identified by "Level" designation, Level I (Level-1) being the highest and Level III (Level-3) being the lowest (some states have four or five designated levels).

The highest levels of trauma centers have access to specialist medical and nursing care, including emergency medicine, trauma surgery, oral and maxillofacial surgery, critical care, neurosurgery, orthopedic surgery, anesthesiology, and radiology, as well as a wide variety of highly specialized and sophisticated surgical and diagnostic equipment. The point of a trauma center, as distinguished from an ordinary hospital, is to maintain the ability to rush critically injured patients into surgery during the golden hour by ensuring that appropriate personnel and equipment are always ready to go on short notice. Lower levels of trauma centers may be able to provide only initial care and stabilization of a traumatic injury and arrange for transfer of the patient to a higher level of trauma care. Receiving care at a trauma center lowers the risk of death by approximately 25% compared to care at non-trauma hospitals.

The operation of a trauma center is often expensive and some areas may be underserved by trauma centers because of that expense. As there is no way to schedule the need for emergency services, patient traffic at trauma centers can vary widely.

A trauma center may have a helipad for receiving patients that have been airlifted to the hospital. In some cases, persons injured in remote areas and transported to a distant trauma center by helicopter can receive faster and better medical care than if they had been transported by ground ambulance to a closer hospital that does not have a designated trauma center.

== History ==
=== United Kingdom ===
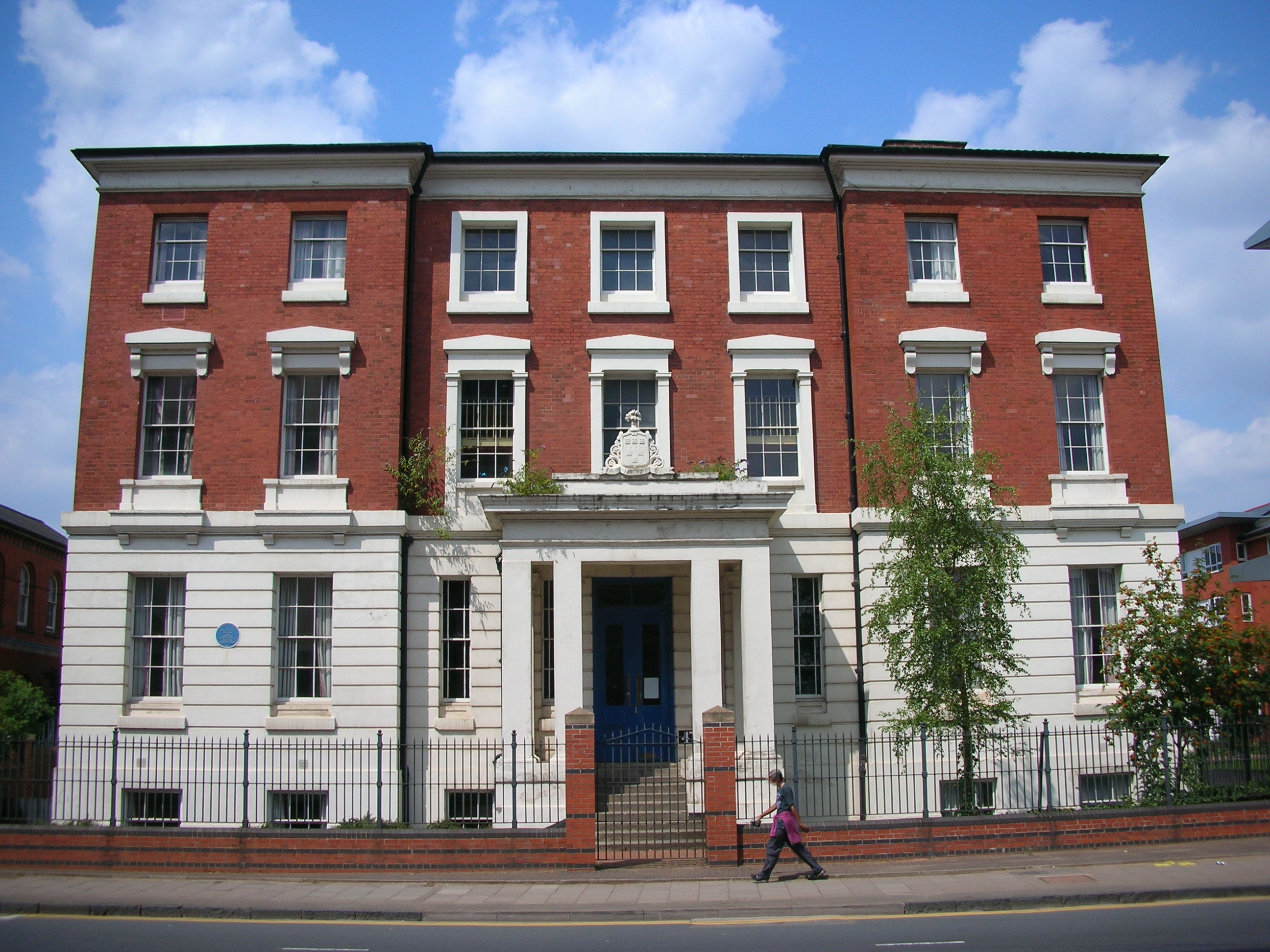
Founded in 1940, Birmingham Accident Hospital in Birmingham, United Kingdom, was the world's first trauma center.

Trauma centres grew into existence out of the realisation that traumatic injury is a disease process unto itself requiring specialised and experienced multidisciplinary treatment and specialised resources. The world's first trauma centre, the first hospital to be established specifically to treat injured rather than ill patients, was the Birmingham Accident Hospital, which opened in Birmingham, England in 1941 after a series of studies found that the treatment of injured persons within England was inadequate. By 1947, the hospital had three trauma teams, each including two surgeons and an anaesthetist, and a burns team with three surgeons. The hospital became part of the National Health Service in its formation in July 1948 and closed in 1993.

=== United States ===
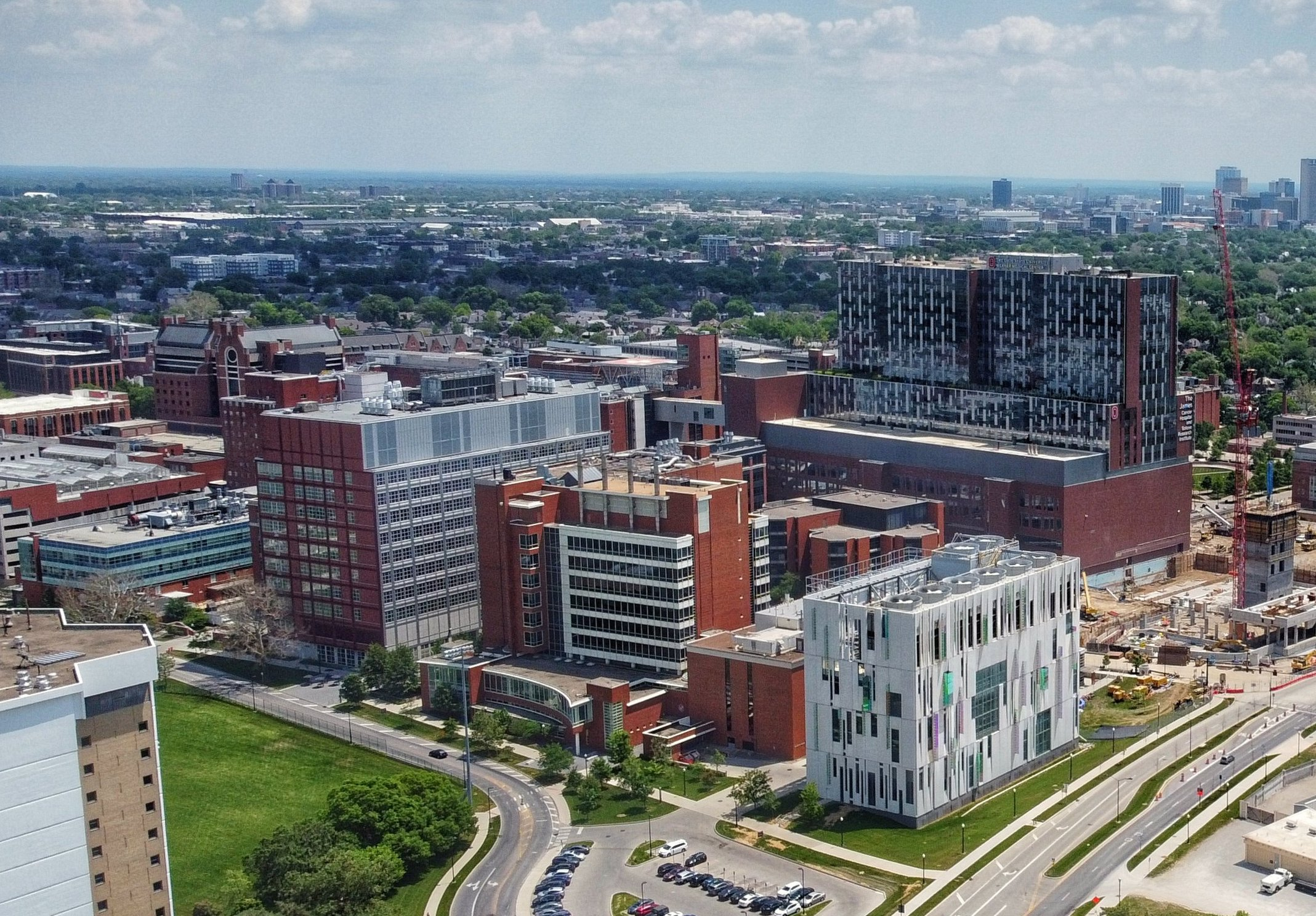
Ohio State University Wexner Medical Center, a Level I trauma center in Columbus, Ohio

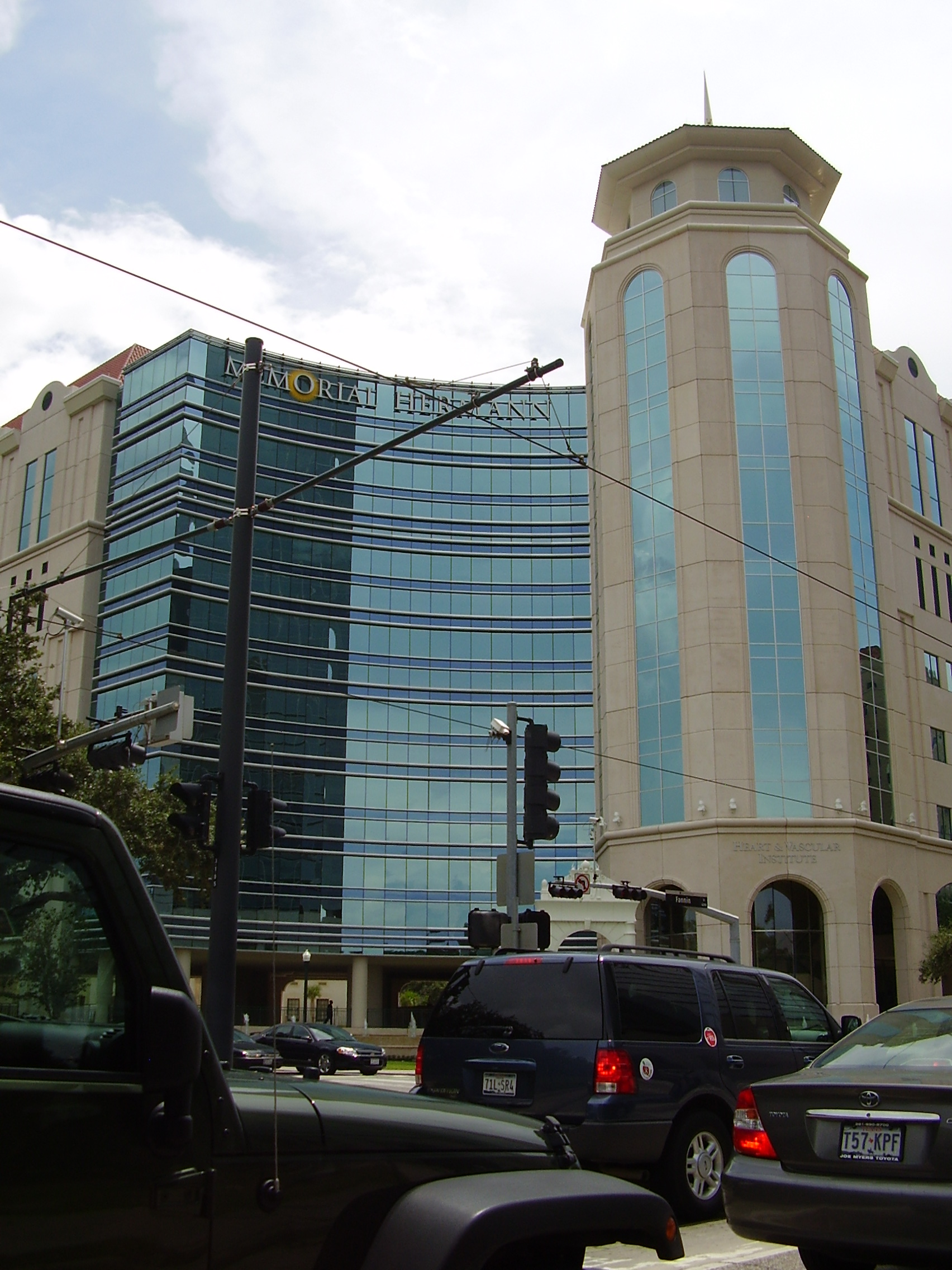
Memorial Hermann–Texas Medical Center, a Level I trauma center in Houston

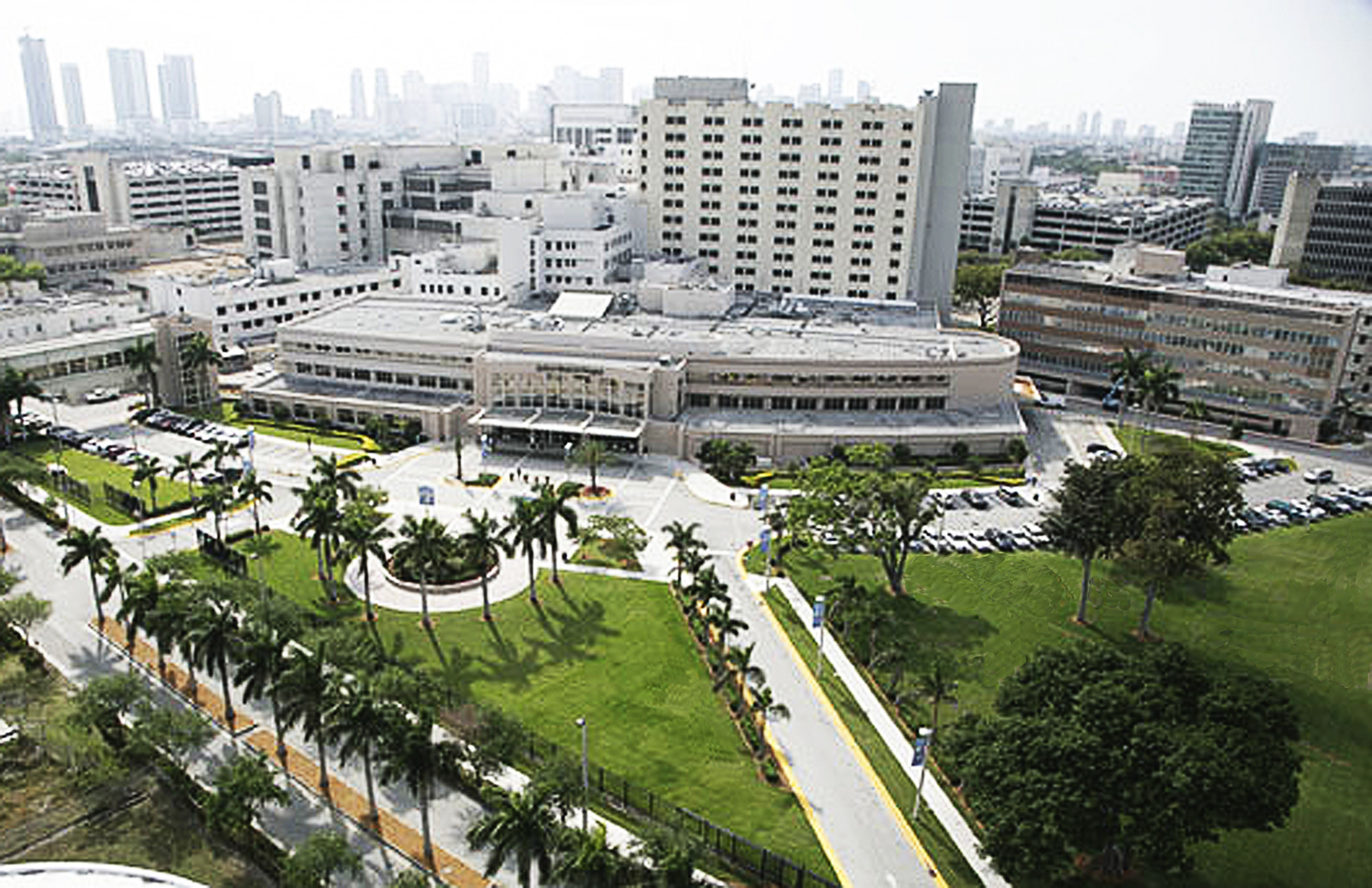
Jackson Memorial Hospital, a Level I trauma center in Miami

According to the CDC, injuries are the leading cause of death for American children and young adults ages 1–19. The leading causes of trauma are motor vehicle collisions, falls, and assaults with a deadly weapon.

In the United States, Robert J. Baker and Robert J. Freeark established the first civilian Shock Trauma Unit at Cook County Hospital (opened 1834) in Chicago, Illinois on March 16, 1966. The concept of a shock trauma center was also developed at the University of Maryland, Baltimore, in the 1950s and 1960s by thoracic surgeon and shock researcher R Adams Cowley, who founded what became the Shock Trauma Center in Baltimore, Maryland, on July 1, 1966. The R Adams Cowley Shock Trauma Center is one of the first shock trauma centers in the world. Cook County Hospital in Chicago trauma center (opened in 1966). David R. Boyd interned at Cook County Hospital from 1963 to 1964 before being drafted into the Army of the United States of America. Upon his release from the Army, Boyd became the first shock-trauma fellow at the R Adams Cowley Shock Trauma Center, and then went on to develop the National System for Emergency Medical Services, under President Ford. In 1968 the American Trauma Society was created by various co-founders, including R Adams Cowley and Rene Joyeuse as they saw the importance of increased education and training of emergency providers and for nationwide quality trauma care.

=== Canada ===
According to the founder of the Trauma Unit at Sunnybrook Health Sciences Centre in Toronto, Ontario, Marvin Tile, "the nature of injuries at Sunnybrook has changed over the years. When the trauma centre first opened in 1976, about 98 per cent of patients suffered from blunt-force trauma caused by accidents and falls. Now, as many as 20 per cent of patients arrive with gunshot and knife wounds".

Fraser Health Authority in British Columbia, located at Royal Columbian Hospital and Abbotsford Regional Hospital, services the BC area, "Each year, Fraser Health treats almost 130,000 trauma patients as part of the integrated B.C. trauma system".

== Definitions in United States ==
In the United States, trauma centers are certified by the American College of Surgeons (ACS) or local state governments, from Level I (comprehensive service) to Level III (limited-care). The different levels refer to the types of resources available in a trauma center and the number of patients admitted yearly. These are categories that define national standards for trauma care in hospitals. Level I through Level II designations are also given adult or pediatric designations. Additionally, some states have their own trauma-center rankings separate from that of the ACS. These levels may range from Level I to Level IV. Some hospitals are less-formally designated Level V.

The ACS does not officially designate hospitals as trauma centers. Numerous U.S. hospitals that are not verified by ACS claim trauma center designation. Most states have legislation that determines the process for designation of trauma centers within that state. The ACS describes this responsibility as "a geopolitical process by which empowered entities, government or otherwise, are authorized to designate." The ACS's self-appointed mission is limited to confirming and reporting on any given hospital's ability to comply with the ACS standard of care known as Resources for Optimal Care of the Injured Patient.

The Trauma Information Exchange Program (TIEP) is a program of the American Trauma Society in collaboration with the Johns Hopkins Center for Injury Research and Policy and is funded by the Centers for Disease Control and Prevention. TIEP maintains an inventory of trauma centers in the US, collects data and develops information related to the causes, treatment and outcomes of injury, and facilitates the exchange of information among trauma care institutions, care providers, researchers, payers and policymakers.

A trauma center is a hospital that is designated by a state or local authority or is verified by the American College of Surgeons.

=== Level I ===
A Level I trauma center provides the highest level of surgical care to trauma patients. Being treated at a Level I trauma center can reduce mortality by 25% compared to a non-trauma center. It has a full range of specialists and equipment available 24 hours a day and admits a minimum required annual volume of severely injured patients.

A Level I trauma center is required to have a certain number of the following people on duty 24 hours a day at the hospital:

- Surgeons
- Emergency physicians
- Anesthesiologists
- Nurses
- Respiratory therapists
- An education program
- Preventive and outreach programs

Key elements include 24‑hour in‑house coverage by general surgeons and prompt availability of care in varying specialties—such as orthopedic surgery, cardiothoracic surgery, neurosurgery, plastic surgery, anesthesiology, emergency medicine, radiology, internal medicine, otolaryngology, oral and maxillofacial surgery, and critical care, which are needed to adequately respond and care for various forms of trauma that a patient may suffer, as well as provide rehabilitation services.

Most Level I trauma centers are teaching hospitals/campuses. Additionally, a Level I center has a program of research, is a leader in trauma education and injury prevention, and is a referral resource for communities in nearby regions.

Level I and II trauma centers are focused on maintaining the capability "to take a patient to the operating room immediately 24/7/365". This requires careful management of hospital resources to ensure their constant availability around the clock. For example, elective surgeries must be booked in such a way as to leave gaps in the schedule, to ensure that at least one fully-equipped operating room is always available for immediate use by the trauma service at all times.

A trauma center must ensure that a general or trauma surgeon can respond to a patient's bedside within 15 minutes of notification at least 80% of the time. To satisfy this requirement, most Level I and many Level II centers have a surgeon in-house at all times, and there is usually another surgeon on backup (that is, on call to respond from home) if needed. They also have a surgical nurse and scrub technician or two surgical nurses in-house at all times to support the trauma surgeon on duty. These surgical personnel must be supported by a complete trauma team of nurses and technicians in the emergency department able to care for, support, and safely transport critically ill patients through the hospital. Nurses on a trauma team are often the most experienced nurses in the emergency department, with extensive training in critical care skills such as advanced airway management and rapid delivery of blood transfusions.

Other specialists do not need to be in-house at the trauma center on a 24/7/365 basis, but they also must be carefully managed to avoid occupational burnout and to ensure consistent rapid response when on call. For example, neurosurgeons are notoriously scarce and will burn out if there are not enough of them on call for a trauma center to share the workload.

=== Level II ===
A Level II trauma center works in collaboration with a Level I center. It provides comprehensive trauma care and supplements the clinical expertise of a Level I institution. It provides 24-hour availability of all essential specialties, personnel, and equipment. Oftentimes, Level II centers possess critical care services capable of caring for almost all injury types indefinitely. Minimum volume requirements may depend on local conditions. Such institutions are not required to have an ongoing program of research or a surgical residency program.

=== Level III ===
A Level III trauma center does not have the full availability of specialists but has resources for emergency resuscitation, surgery, and intensive care of most trauma patients. A Level III center has transfer agreements with Level I or Level II trauma centers that provide back-up resources for the care of patients with exceptionally severe injuries, such as multiple trauma.

=== Level IV ===
A Level IV trauma center exists in some states in which the resources do not exist for a Level III trauma center. It provides initial evaluation, stabilization, diagnostic capabilities, and transfer to a higher level of care. It may also provide surgery and critical-care services, as defined in the scope of services for trauma care. A trauma-trained nurse is immediately available, and physicians are available upon the patient's arrival in the Emergency Department. Transfer agreements exist with other trauma centers of higher levels, for use when conditions warrant a transfer.

=== Level V ===
A Level V trauma center provides initial evaluation, stabilization, diagnostic capabilities, and transfer to a higher level of care. They may provide surgical and critical-care services, as defined in the service's scope of trauma care services. A trauma-trained nurse is immediately available, and physicians are available upon patient arrival in the emergency department. If not open 24 hours daily, the facility must have an after-hours trauma response protocol.

=== Pediatric trauma centers ===
A facility can be designated an adult trauma center, a pediatric trauma center, or an adult and pediatric trauma center. If a hospital provides trauma care to both adult and pediatric patients, the level designation may not be the same for each group. For example, a Level I adult trauma center may also be a Level II pediatric trauma center because pediatric trauma surgery is a specialty unto itself. Adult trauma surgeons are not generally specialized in providing surgical trauma care to children and vice versa, and the difference in practice is significant.

In contrast to adult trauma centers, the ACS will only verify and most states designate pediatric trauma centers as either Level I or Level II. Only a handful of states designate pediatric trauma centers beyond Level II; Hawaii and Washington designate up to Level III, while New Hampshire and Texas designate up to Level IV.

== Current system in the United Kingdom ==
There are 27 major trauma centres (MTCs) in England, four in Scotland, one in Wales and one in Northern Ireland. The UK system operates on a "hub and spoke" model with regional trauma networks headed by one or two major trauma centres (MTCs) and supported by trauma units (TUs).

=== Major trauma centre ===
Major trauma centres are very similar to Level I trauma centers in the U.S., with teams of specialized care available around the clock to treat patients with injuries of all possible severity. MTCs can be designated as "adult only", "children's only" or "adult and children" to identify what patients they are prepared to treat.

=== Trauma unit ===
Trauma units can play two roles, the first is to care for those who are less seriously injured which avoids overconsumption of resources in the major trauma centres. The other is to stabilize then transfer patients who are far from a major trauma centre or too unstable to be transported there directly.

== See also ==
- List of trauma centers in the United States
- Trauma (medicine)
- Traumatology
