= Michael L. Marin =

American vascular surgeon (born 1956)

- Born: 1956 (age 69–70)
- Education: Columbia-Presbyterian Medical Center; Montefiore Medical Center/Albert Einstein College of Medicine
- Occupation: Vascular surgeon
- Medical career
- Institutions: Cleveland Clinic; New York University Medical Center; Icahn School of Medicine at Mount Sinai; The Mount Sinai Hospital

Michael L. Marin (born 1956) is an American vascular surgeon. Together with Drs. Frank Veith, Juan C. Parodi and Claudio J. Schonholz, he was the first in the United States to perform minimally invasive aortic aneurysm surgery (stent-graft procedure). In 2004, he was the first doctor to implant an intravascular telemetric monitor—a device that alerts to physicians any leakage in aortic stent-grafts.

== Early life and education ==
Marin was born in 1956.

Marin attended medical school at Mt. Sinai Medical School in New York. Marin's internship and residency were at Columbia-Presbyterian Medical Center in New York City, and his fellowship in vascular surgery was at Montefiore Medical Center/Albert Einstein College of Medicine. Marin joined the staff of Icahn School of Medicine at Mount Sinai in 1996, the same year he became a Fellow of the American College of Surgeons.

== Career ==
In 1997, he co-founded the Teramed Corporation, which concentrated on the development and manufacturing of aortic stent graft devices. In 1999 he was appointed the Henry Kaufman Professor of Surgery. As of 2020, Marin is chief of the Division of Vascular Surgery In 2001, he was named the chief of vascular surgery at Mount Sinai Hospital. In December 2003, Dr. Marin became surgeon-in-chief and chairman of the Department of Surgery at Icahn School of Medicine. In 2007, he became the Julius H. Jacobson II, MD, Professor of Vascular Surgery. As of 2020, Marin is the co-inventor on 12 patents.

He also helped create Mount Sinai's Kyabirwa Surgical Facility, an ambulatory surgery center in Kyabirwa, a rural village in Uganda. Marin is interested in awake surgery, where the patient remains awake during the operation and only local anesthesia is used rather than general anaesthesia.

== Patents ==
- Method and apparatus concerning bypass grafts, Patent number: 6575994, Assignee: Teramed, Inc.
- Method for endoluminal excluding an aortic aneurysm, Patent number: 6168610, Assignee: Endovascular Systems, Inc.
- Method and apparatus for deploying non-circular stents and graft stent complexes, Patent number: 6039749, Assignee: Endovascular Systems, Inc.
- Device for delivering and deploying intraluminal devices, Patent number: 5697948, Assignee: Endovascular Systems, Inc.
- Method and apparatus for forming an endoluminal bifurcated graft, Patent number: 5695517, Assignee: Endovascular Systems, Inc.
- Apparatus and method for deployment of radially expandable stents by a mechanical linkage, Patent number: 5618300, Assignee: Endovascular Systems, Inc.
- Method for the deployment of radially expandable stents, Patent number: 5591196, Assignee: Endovascular Systems, Inc.
- Method for delivering and deploying intraluminal devices, Patent number: 5569296, Assignee: Stentco, Inc.
- Method and apparatus for forming an endoluminal bifurcated graft, Patent number: 5507769, Assignee: Stentco, Inc.
- Device for delivering and deploying intraluminal devices, Patent number: 5456694, Assignee: Stentco, Inc.
- Apparatus and method for deployment of radially expandable stents by a mechanical linkage, Patent number: 5443477, Assignee: Stentco, Inc.
- Intraluminal stent, Patent number: 5397355, Assignee: Stentco, Inc.

== Publications ==
Marin authored over 60 chapters and has been published in over 180 peer-reviewed medical journals and one book, Endovascular Grafting Techniques (ISBN 0-6833-0209-4). Many articles focus on intimal hyperplasia, endovascular surgery, and surgical techniques.

A partial list of publications:

- Baril, DT; Denoya, PI; Ellozy, SH; Carroccio, A; Marin, ML (2007). "Endovascular repair of a traumatic arteriovenous fistula 34 years after the injury: report of a case". Surg. Today. 37: 78–81. doi:10.1007/s00595-006-3323-5. PMID 17186353.
- Baril, DT; Silverberg, D; Ellozy, SH; et al. (January 2008). "Endovascular stent-graft repair of failed endovascular abdominal aortic aneurysm repair". Ann Vasc Surg. 22: 30–6. doi:10.1016/j.avsg.2007.10.003. PMID 18083340.
- Baril, DT; Kahn, RA; Ellozy, SH; Carroccio, A; Marin, ML (October 2007). "Endovascular abdominal aortic aneurysm repair: emerging developments and anesthetic considerations". J. Cardiothorac. Vasc. Anesth. 21: 730–42. doi:10.1053/j.jvca.2007.03.001. PMID 17905287.
- Kahn, RA; Moskowitz, DM; Marin, ML; Hollier, LH; Parsons, R; Teodorescu, V; McLaughlin, M (2000). "Safety and efficacy of high-dose adenosine-induced asystole during endovascular AAA repair". J Endovasc Ther. 7: 292–6. doi:10.1177/152660280000700406. PMID 10958293.
- Sachdev, U; Baril, DT; Ellozy, SH; et al. (October 2006). "Management of aneurysms involving branches of the celiac and superior mesenteric arteries: a comparison of surgical and endovascular therapy". J. Vasc. Surg. 44: 718–24. doi:10.1016/j.jvs.2006.06.027. PMID 17011997.
- Silverberg, D; Baril, DT; Ellozy, SH; et al. (September 2006). "An 8-year experience with type II endoleaks: natural history suggests selective intervention is a safe approach". J. Vasc. Surg. 44: 453–9. doi:10.1016/j.jvs.2006.04.058. PMID 16950415.
- Baril, DT; Carroccio, A; Ellozy, SH; et al. (August 2006). "Evolving strategies for the treatment of aortoenteric fistulas". J. Vasc. Surg. 44: 250–7. doi:10.1016/j.jvs.2006.04.031. PMID 16890849.
- Baril, DT; Palchik, E; Carroccio, A; et al. (June 2006). "Experience with endovascular abdominal aortic aneurysm repair in nonagenarians". J. Endovasc. Ther. 13: 330–7. doi:10.1583/06-1814R.1. PMID 16784320.
- Baril, DT; Ellozy, SH; Carroccio, A; Marin, ML (2005). "Branched endografts for treatment of complex aortic aneurysms". Surg Technol Int. 14: 245–52. PMID 16525980.
- Silverberg, D; Baril, DT; Schneiderman, J; et al. (February 2006). "[Endovascular repair of abdominal aortic aneurysms]". Harefuah. 145: 127–30, 165. PMID 16509418.
- Addis, MD; Baril, DT; Ellozy, SH; et al. (2004). "Endovascular therapy for aortic disease". Surg Technol Int. 13: 221–6. PMID 15744694.
- Baril, DT; Ellozy, SH; Carroccio, A; Patel, AB; Lookstein, RA; Marin, ML (November 2004). "Endovascular repair of an infected carotid artery pseudoaneurysm". J. Vasc. Surg. 40: 1024–7. doi:10.1016/j.jvs.2004.08.019. PMID 15557920.
