= Golden hour (medicine) =

Concept in medicine regarding immediate treatment

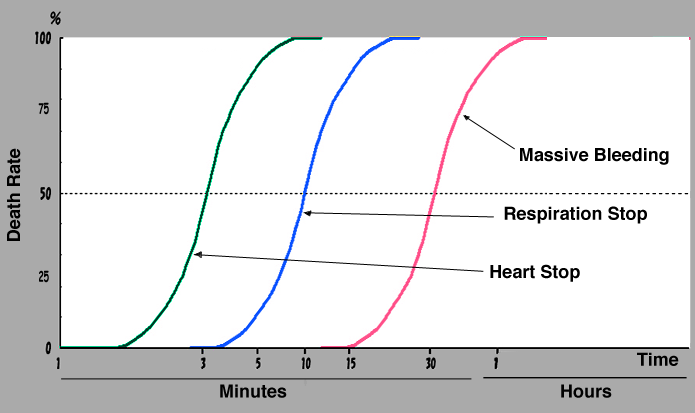
Golden hour principle

In emergency medicine, the golden hour is the period of time immediately after a traumatic injury during which there is the highest likelihood that prompt medical and surgical treatment will prevent death. While initially defined as an hour, the exact time period depends on the nature of the injury and can be more than or less than this duration. It is well established that the person's chances of survival are greatest if they receive care within a short period of time after a severe injury; however, there is no evidence to suggest that survival rates drop off after 60 minutes. Some have come to use the term to refer to the core principle of rapid intervention in trauma cases, rather than the narrow meaning of a critical one-hour time period.

== General concept ==
Cases of severe trauma, especially internal bleeding, require surgical intervention. Complications such as shock may occur if the person is not managed appropriately and expeditiously. It therefore becomes a priority to transport people with severe trauma as fast as possible to specialists, most often found at a hospital trauma center, for treatment. Because some injuries can cause people to deteriorate extremely rapidly, the lag time between injury and treatment should ideally be kept to a bare minimum.

The recommended amount of time for emergency medical services is less than 10 minutes at the location of the trauma before transporting.

== Origins of the term ==
R Adams Cowley is credited with promoting this concept circa 1944, first in his capacity as a military surgeon and later as head of the University of Maryland Shock Trauma Center. The concept of the "Golden Hour" may have been derived from the French military's World War I data. The R Adams Cowley Shock Trauma Center section of the University of Maryland Medical Center's website quotes Cowley as saying, "There is a golden hour between life and death. If you are critically injured you have less than 60 minutes to survive. You might not die right then; it may be three days or two weeks later — but something has happened in your body that is irreparable."

== Controversy ==
While most medical professionals agree that delays in definitive care are undesirable as they may lead to significant increases in morbidity and mortality, research casts doubt on the validity of the golden hour as it appears to lack a scientific basis. Bryan Bledsoe, a physician and outspoken critic of the golden hour and other controversial medical topics, such as critical incident stress management, has said that the peer-reviewed medical literature does not demonstrate any "magical time" for saving critical patients. There are different critical periods for different injuries.

== See also ==
- Air ambulance
- Window of opportunity
