= Ramon Berguer =

Spanish-American surgeon, professor of medicine

Ramon Berguer is Frankel Professor of Cardiovascular Surgery, Professor Emeritus of Surgery, and Professor of Biomedical Engineering at the University of Michigan.

Berguer was born in 1940 in A Coruña, Spain. He qualified as a doctor with an MD degree from the University of Barcelona, Spain, in 1962. He trained in general and vascular Surgery at the Henry Ford Hospital in Detroit, Michigan, US. On his return to Spain he joined the opposition to General Franco's dictatorship and was active in the organization of the resistance among professionals. In 1972 he left for England to avoid detention and there he continued to organize international support for Spain's political prisoners with the help of the British Labor Party's leadership. In London he worked at Kings College Hospital and then obtained a PhD in Engineering from the University of Surrey. In 1975 he returned to the US as a surgeon at Wayne State University, Detroit.

Berguer was the 55th President of the Society for Vascular Surgery, and Professor of Surgery at Wayne State University, and Chief of the Division of Vascular Surgery at the Detroit Medical Center until 2004, when he joined the University of Michigan Medical School as its first Frankel Professor of Vascular Surgery.
