= R Adams Cowley =

American traumatologist and surgeon (1917–1991)

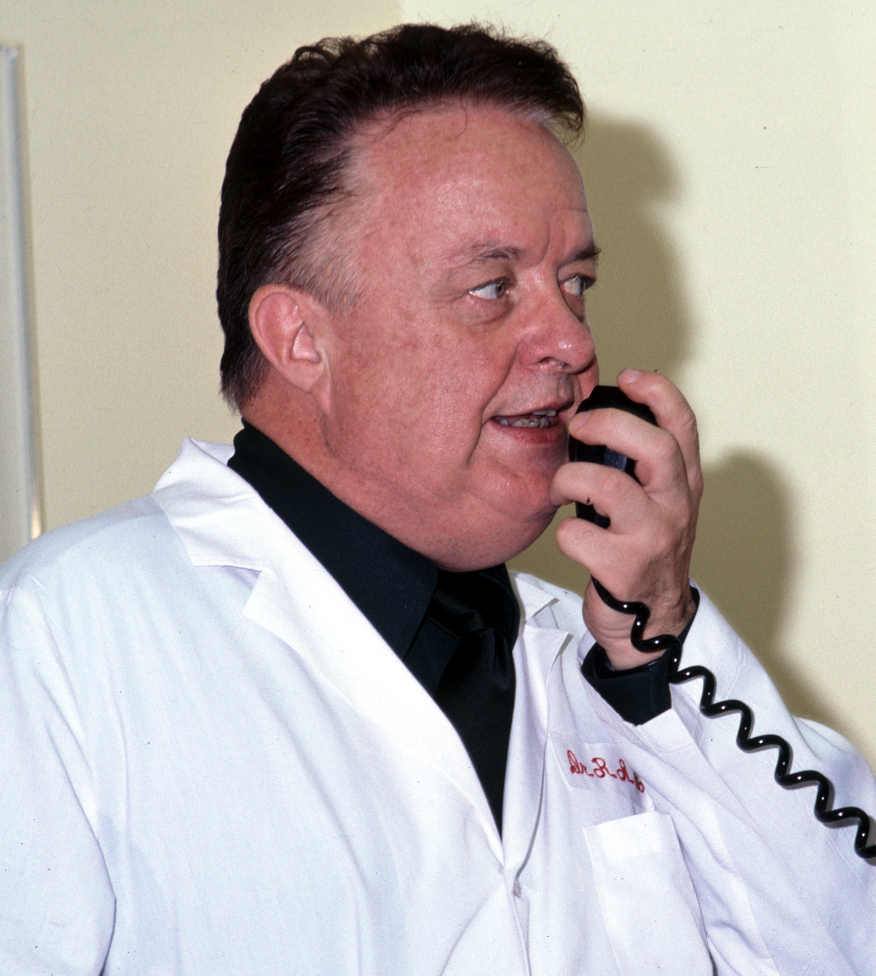
- Cowley in 1977
- Born: July 25, 1917; Layton, Utah, US
- Died: October 27, 1991 (aged 74); Baltimore, Maryland, US
- Education: University of Utah; University of Maryland
- Years active: 1951—1991
- Known for: Establishing the first trauma center in the US; the Golden Hour concept
- Spouse(s): Marjorie Smith (m. 1936; div. 1960) Roberta Schwartz (m. 1985)
- Children: 2
- Relatives: Spencer Adams (uncle)
- Medical career
- Profession: Surgeon
- Field: Medicine
- Sub-specialties: Emergency medicine, cardiovascular/thoracic medicine

R Adams Cowley (July 25, 1917, Layton, Utah—October 27, 1991, Baltimore, Maryland) was an American traumatologist and surgeon who is considered a pioneer in emergency medicine and the treatment of life-threatening shock following severe traumatic injury. Called the "father of modern trauma medicine", Cowley first observed what he later called the "Golden Hour" while working as a war surgeon in post-World War II Europe. He noticed that trauma patients who were treated immediately and aggressively had a better chance of survival, especially when the doctors and nurses were specially trained in trauma medicine, than those whose treatment was slow or delayed.

This observation eventually led him to found the Shock Trauma Center at the University of Maryland Hospital in 1962 with a grant from the US Army. When it was established, about 40% of critically injured accident victims survived; by the time he retired in 1989, that percentage had increased to 90%. The Maryland Institute for Emergency Medicine (later the Maryland Institute for Emergency Medical Services Systems, or MIEMSS) grew from the trauma center in the early 1970s and made Maryland the first in the nation to have a statewide EMS system. A 1986 study showed that Maryland had an accident survival rate 2.5 times higher than the national average. The Shock Trauma Center was a model for trauma units, which spread across the country as the impact became clear, numbering 165 centers by 1985.

In addition to the Shock Trauma Center and MIEMSS, Cowley pioneered emergency medicine as its own area of study, the use of helicopters to quickly transport accident victims to the hospital best suited to treat them, and the concept of trauma as a disease. He was a thoracic and cardiovascular surgeon and was one of the first to perform open-heart surgery, and was head and professor of the Division of Thoracic and Cardiovascular Surgery at the University of Maryland. He also contributed to research in hyperbaric oxygen treatment, blood composition theory, and medical devices.

== Early life and education ==
Cowley was born in Layton, Utah, on July 25, 1917, to pharmacist William Wallace Cowley and Alta Louise Adams. His father was the first in his family to graduate from college and founded Kowley Drugs in 1919 with his brothers-in-law Spencer Adams and E. G. King. Adams and King later sold their share to Cowley, whose family managed the store until it was bought by Safeway in 1980. R Adams Cowley's maternal grandfather, Rufus Adams, was a merchant, banker, and Utah state senator (1921-1924). Adams told Cowley's mother that, if she named her son after him, he would give her a "wicker baby carriage;" she got as far as writing the first letter before changing her mind. As such, his name birth name is R Adams Cowley, with no period after the R.

Raised Mormon, Cowley was one of five sons; his brothers Stanford, Bill, Kermit, and Hal all pursued careers in pharmacy. In a 1982 interview, he referred to himself as "just a country boy" who broke wild horses in his childhood. He graduated from Davis High School, where he played football and did track and javelin. He told Sun Magazine that he was suspended from Davis five times, and was later expelled from University of Utah, where he was studying on a pre-med track, for playing poker. He finished his degree in 1940, graduating eighth in his class despite the interruption.

Cowley moved to Baltimore to study medicine at the University of Maryland but nearly dropped out due to homesickness. He was drafted into the Army Students Training Program, which paid for his room, board, and tuition, and graduated in 1944. He started training in general surgery at Maryland and spent six weeks at Valley Forge Hospital in Phoenixville, Pennsylvania for additional training. He was commissioned a second lieutenant in the US Army Medical Corps in 1944 and did special officer's training in San Antonio. He was sent first to France, then to Germany, as a military surgeon in the aftermath of World War II. He worked with the 98th Field Hospital in Munich and later Allgemeines Krankenhaus in Vienna. He took note of the speed and accuracy with which European surgeons worked and improved his own skills by modeling them. When he returned to the US, he completed his residency at University of Maryland, then moved to University of Michigan to train in thoracic surgery for two years.

== Career ==
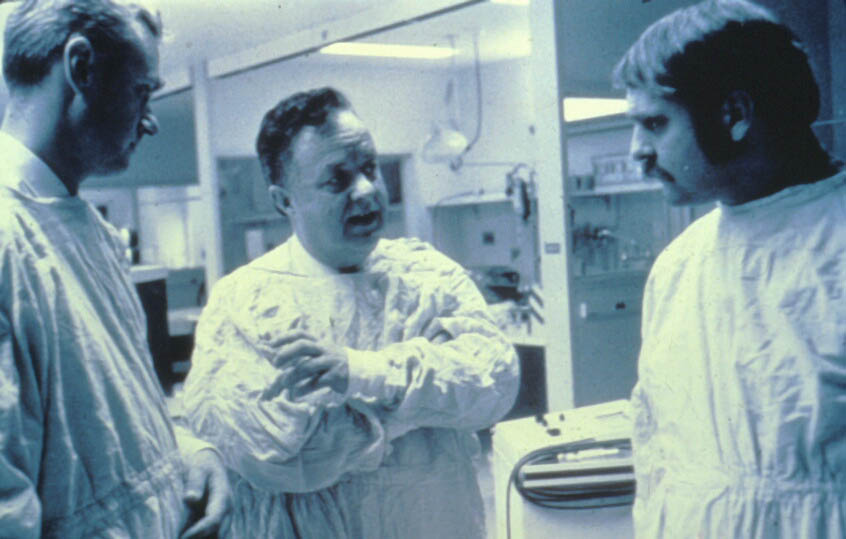
R Adams Cowley instructs his team in the Critical Care Resuscitation Unit

While in the army, Cowley observed that the survival of a trauma patient was dictated by how quickly and aggressively they were treated in the 60 minutes following their injury. He dubbed this the "Golden Hour", a now widely-observed theory that focuses on preventing shock from irreparably damaging the organs by stressing the cruciality of "speed as well as skill in operating procedures." After finishing his training at University of Michigan, Cowley returned to the University of Maryland to teach and do research. By the mid-1950s, he was chair of University of Maryland Hospital's thoracic surgery division, and the chief heart and lung surgeon by 1960. While serving as director of the Cardiopulmonary Lab (1951-1962), he concluded that animals have different responses to shock and that the "approach to shock needed to be multidisciplinary" and had to be tested on humans in situ. He began lobbying for the establishment of a trauma center, claiming that a traditional emergency room was not sufficient in skill, time, or equipment to handle traumatic injuries. In 1958, the US Army awarded him a $100,000 contract to study shock in humans; he used the grant to start the first clinical shock trauma center in the country, which officially opened as part of the University of Maryland Hospital in 1962.

The center started as a two-bed research unit and was referred to by skeptics as the "death lab." Cowley championed the trauma response ideology of "treat first, diagnose later," insisting that patients in emergency rooms died from shock while waiting for doctors to diagnose them. This, coupled with pushback from hospitals and doctors who felt that their patients were being taken away, made the center controversial. Cowley himself was labeled as "arrogant, determined, stubborn, [and] difficult to get along with," a reputation Marvin Mandel referenced affectionately in his eulogy at Cowley's funeral in 1991. Still, Cowley remained undeterred, and the center grew incrementally to 32 beds before the end of the decade. Construction on a new federally-funded facility, including a donated high-pressure chamber in the basement and a dedicated biochemistry lab, was completed in 1969. The same year, after extensive negotiations, the first medevac transport to the trauma center by the Maryland State Police was completed using the helipad on the hospital roof. This allowed not only for a shorter travel time, but also for communication between the pilot and/or onboard physician and the trauma center, giving the trauma team the opportunity and information needed to prepare for the patient's arrival. In the late 1980s, Cowley helped select the type of helicopters he wanted for the medevac fleet. He chose the 365N-1 Dauphin II because it was nearly nine minutes faster on average than Bell Textron's models.

In 1971, State Legislature Clerk Jim Mause was brought to the trauma center in critical condition after a car accident. His successful recovery caught the attention of Mause's friend and colleague Marvin Mandel, the state governor, who met with Cowley to discuss the center. In 1973, Mandel signed an executive order that financially split the trauma center from the medical school, meaning it would receive funding directly from the government rather than receiving a small share of the University of Maryland's federal monies, a decision that drew criticism from the university. This order turned the trauma center into the Maryland Institute for Emergency Medicine and established the Division of Emergency Medical Services; Cowley was made director of both. They were combined in 1977 to create the Maryland Institute for Emergency Medical Services Systems (MIEMSS), making Maryland the first to have a statewide EMS system. It wasn't until 1979, nearly 20 years after the center opened, that anyone "believed that trauma centers made a difference," according to Donald Trunkey. By 1985, Cowley's trauma center ideology had taken hold enough that there were 165 trauma centers in the United States. In 1982, Cowley started the Mid-Atlantic Council, which "allow[ed] movement of trauma cases across eight state lines so patients in any of the cooperating jurisdictions [could] be taken as quickly as possible to the most appropriate center."

The Shock Trauma Center started offering interdisciplinary emergency training on a large scale, including the 1976 Inner Harbor Disaster Exercise, wherein "local police, aviation officials, doctors, hospital crews and others from various emergency agencies" spent three hours working together to identify shortfalls and to prepare for actual emergencies. The training was held during the USA Bicentennial Emergency Medical Services and Traumatology Conference and Exhibition. By 1980, the center had expanded to 54 beds and launched a bachelor's degree in emergency health services, and in December 1985 broke ground on a $45 million, eight-story building. The new, 138-bed building was opened in February 1989, and was officially renamed the R Adams Cowley Shock Trauma Center in May. The center had its own rooftop helipad and space designed specifically for recovery and rehabilitation. Cowley retired as director in mid-May 1989 after nearly 30 years. He accepted a role as director at the Mathias National Center for the Study of Trauma and Emergency Medical Services, which had been established by Congress at University of Maryland in 1987 after receiving approval from President Reagan the year before. The Study Center focused on providing information about "trauma prevention, injury control[,] public policy," and national disaster plans for medical teams globally. Cowley also served as a special adviser to Governor William Donald Schaefer.

Between the center opening in 1962 and a 1971 article in The Evening Sun, the unit's "applied research" led the staff to the realization that many of the head trauma deaths they encountered were not due to head injuries but to "metabolic problems triggered by the head injur[ies]." The clinicians were then able to bring the death rate down from 67% to 22% in less than ten years. At the time of his retirement in 1989, the "survival rate of critically injured accident victims" had risen from 40% in 1962 to nearly 90%. A 1986 study reported that Maryland's accident survival rate was more than 2.5 times higher than the national average. In 1991, at the time of Cowley's death, the Echelons of Care network consisted of 49 hospitals with 24-hour ERs, 20 specialty referral centers, and 10 area trauma centers, as well as 450 ambulances and a fleet of medevac helicopters. Marvin Mandel shared in his eulogy of Cowley that detractors of his methods were quickly silenced by the results.

In addition to all of his clinical work, Cowley was also a professor of thoracic and cardiovascular surgery at University of Maryland (1960-1991) and a clinical professor of medicine at Pennsylvania State University (1980-1991).

=== Other notable research ===
In addition to his work developing emergency medicine, Cowley also contributed to the fields of hyperbaric oxygen treatment, blood composition theory, medical devices, and thoracic and cardiovascular surgery. He was among the first surgeons to perform open-heart surgery and, in 1956, helped design a surgical clamp with John M. Allen called the Cowley-Allen Clamp. He worked on the prototype transistorized pacemaker used by Dwight D. Eisenhower, as well as on artificial blood vessels and heart valves, and self-balancing electronic monitoring systems.

Some of Cowley's early research was in the use of radioactive cobalt-60 in shrinking inoperable lung and esophageal cancers to a more manageable size, allowing patients to undergo surgery successfully. In the late 1950s, 12 of the 22 patients he studied were cancer-free up to three years following surgery, around three times the survival rate of patients without radiation. He also studied the use of ammonia in cases of coma and shock caused by liver infection. In the early 1970s, Cowley and his staff at Shock Trauma discovered that high-pressure chambers can be used to kill gas gangrene by forcing oxygen into the bloodstream.

In the late 1970s, Cowley worked with NASA to develop and test a "briefcase-sized machine that could transmit messages by satellite during a disaster or medical emergency."

=== Professional activities ===
In 1959, Cowley was part of the Baltimore Medical Society, the Society for Vascular Surgery, and the John Alexander Society; was a fellow of the American College of Surgeons; and was a diplomat of the American Board of Surgery. By 1979, he was also part of the American Association for the Advancement of Science, International Cardiovascular Society, American College of Emergency Physicians, Underseas Medical Society, Society of Automotive Medicine, and University Association for Emergency Medical Services. He was a founding member of both the Society of Thoracic Surgeons and the American Trauma Society. From 1972 to 1976, he was a special consultant to Senator Alan Cranston, Chairman of the Senate Sub-committee on Health, and Senator J. Glenn Beall Jr. on federal EMS legislation. In 1989, he became a special advisor to Governor William Donald Schaefer.

Cowley served on a number of committees during his career, including: Committee on Hyperbaric Oxygenation (1962-1966); Committee on Shock (1962-1971); Committee on Blood Components (1970); Mayor's Professional Advisory Committee (1973-1977); American College of Surgeons Credentials Committee (1974-1989); Advisory Panel on National Health Insurance in the House Ways and Means Subcommittee on Health (1975);; Governor's Commission on Fire Services (1974-1975); National Highway Safety Advisory Committee as a Presidential Appointee from President Carter (1978); Maryland State Highway Safety Coordinating Committee, as a Governor Appointee (1978); Emergency Management Advisory Council for the State of Maryland (1981); Public Service Helicopter Technology Transfer Advisory Group for NASA (1983-1989); and National Spinal Cord Injury Hotline's Advisory Board (1984-1988). Cowley served as chairman for the Mid-Atlantic EMS Council (1973-1989) and the National Coalition for Emergency Medical Services (1980). He also sat on the Board of Directors for the International Society of Emergency Medical Services (1981-1982) and was president of the American Trauma Society (1982-1984).

He was editor for Emergency Department News (1980) and Journal of the World Association for Emergency and Disaster Medicine (1986-1989), and an editorial board member for Disaster Medicine (1983-1990), American Journal of Emergency Medicine (1983-1990), Trauma Quarterly (1984-1990), and Emergency Medicine News (1989-1991). He was included in American Men of Medicine (1961), which highlighted prolific physicians and surgeons, and the Baltimore Sun included him on their list 150 People Who Shaped the Way We Live in 1988.

Cowley had more than 400 publications to his name, including as an author or contributor on a number of textbooks including Pathophysiology of Shock, Anoxia and Ischemia (1981), and Shock Trauma: Critical Care Handbook (1986); peer-reviewed journal articles; and white papers such as Accidental Death and Injury - The Neglected American Disease. By 1977, he had already published more than 250 articles on thoracic and cardiovascular surgery and shock/trauma. In 1980, St. Martin's Press published Shocktrauma, a book by Jon Franklin and Alan Doelp about Cowley's career and legacy. This inspired the creation of the 1982 TV movie Shocktrauma, in which Cowley is portrayed by William Conrad.

== Personal life ==
Cowley and Marjorie Smith were married in September 1936 in Ogden, Utah. Their daughter, Kaye, was born the following April. The couple divorced in 1960, which Cowley attributed to the long hours he spent working. In May 1985, he married his colleague Roberta Schwartz, a speech–language pathologist and daughter of a physician at the University of Virginia. Their son, R Adams Cowley II, was born in early October 1991. Cowley's daughter, Kaye, was an educator and his son, R Adams, is a physician.

Cowley died from heart failure at his Baltimore home on October 27, 1991, just three weeks after the birth of his son. He was buried with full military honors in Arlington National Cemetery. At the time of his death, he was an Elder in the Church of Jesus Christ of Latter-day Saints. His personal and professional papers were collected by the University of Utah.

According to the website his wife Roberta created to document his legacy, Cowley was an amateur oil painter and a licensed pilot.

== Honors and awards ==
Year	Award/honor	Awarding body	Notes	Refs
1979	William S. Stone Lectureship Award	American Trauma Society		
1979	Distinguished Alumni Award	University of Utah	For "pioneering in the treatment of shock and trauma, the development of emergency medical service systems and his work in thoracic surgery and hyperbaric oxygen therapy"	
1980	Congressional Certificate of Merit	Congress of the United States of America	March 19, 1980	
1980	Award for Public Service	National Highway Traffic Safety Administration	March 1980; awarded for his part in pioneering the use of med-evac flights in civilian emergencies	
1981	Honorary Diploma	Cruz Roja Mexicana and Association Mexicana de Medicina Critica y Terapia Intensiva	August 1981	
1982	Arizona Award of Appreciation	Government of Pima County, Arizona	April 1982	
1982	Robert F. Kennedy Lectureship Award	University Association of Emergency Medicine		
1983	Appreciation Award for Services Rendered	United States Department of Justice/Federal Bureau of Investigation	December 1983	
1984	Andrew White Medal	Loyola University Maryland	March 1984	
1984	Award for Public Service	National Highway Traffic Safety Administration	May 1984	
1984	Certificate of Appreciation	National Committee for Employer Support of National Guard and Reserves	June 1984	
1986	AAMC Award, Group on Public Affairs	Association of American Medical Colleges	October 1986	
1987	Award for Increasing Public Awareness of Red Cross Response to Amtrak Disaster	American Red Cross	January 4, 1987	
1987	Stanley W. Gustafson Leadership Award	Highway Users Federation	November 4, 1987; for his contributions to highway safety	
1987	Publication Design Award	Noble Steed Associates	"The System Saving Lives"	
1988	Honorary Presidency	Panamerican Trauma Society		
1989	Hall of Fame and Honorary Membership	Eastern Association for the Surgery of Trauma		
1989	Public Service Award	American Trauma Association		
1989	Distinguished Achievement Award	American Trauma Society	For co-founding the Society and for his efforts in the treatment and prevention of trauma	
1989	Resolution in Appreciation	The Fire Chiefs Council, Regional Planning Council		
1989	Plaque in Recognition of Exemplary Performance	The Fire Chiefs Committee of the Regional Planning Council		
1989	Certificate of Appreciation	American Red Cross		
1989	Man of the Year Award	Arlene Rosenbloom Wyman Guild		
1990	Special Award	Bell Helicopter Textron	"Developing the Nation's Premier Emergency Medical Services System;" March 1990	
?	World War II Victory Medal			
?	World War II Army Occupation Medal			
?	Inclusion in Utah's Heroes	University of Utah	Posthumous	

=== State/local ===
Year	Award/honor	Awarding body	Notes	Refs
1976	Mayor's Citation	City of Baltimore	May 10, 1976	
1977	Governor's Citation	State of Maryland	April 5, 1977	
1977	Distinguished Marylander Award	Advertising Club of Baltimore	May 1977	
1977	Certificate of Distinguished Citizenship	State of Maryland		
1977	Official Citation	Maryland House of Delegates	House Resolution 461	
1977	Certificate of Appreciation	Maryland State Firemen's Association		
1979	Certificate of Appreciation	Maryland State Firemen's Association		
1980	Baltimore's Best Award		January 17, 1980	
1980	Citation	Maryland Chapter, American College of Emergency Physicians	March 17, 1980	
1980	Citation, Outstanding Service	Safety Council of Maryland	June 18, 1980	
1980	Honorary Member	University of Maryland Police Department at Baltimore		
1980	Baltimore's Best Silver and Blue Award	Baltimore is Best	For his "outstanding contribution to Baltimore's emergency medicine system" in the Shock Trauma Center	
1982	Award for Outstanding Service	Associated Italian American Charities of Maryland	November 1982	
1986	Honor Award and Gold Key Recipient	University of Maryland, School of Medicine	May 10, 1986	
1986	Civic Achievement Award	Engineering Society of Baltimore	April 23, 1986	
1987	Resolution	State Senate of Maryland	In Recognition of MIEMSS Performance in Amtrak-Conrail Train Accident	
1988	Honors Award	The Maryland Speech-Language-Hearing Association		
1988	Marylander of the Year Award	The Maryland Colonial Society		
1992	Honors Award	Maryland Speech-Language-Hearing Association	For his work in trauma rehabilitaiton in Maryland	

== Selected papers ==
- Yeacer, GH; Cowley, RA (September 1948). "Studies on the use of polythene as a fibrous tissue stimulant". Annals of Surgery. 128 (3): 509–520.
- Blair, E; Henning, G; Hornick, R; Cowley, RA (1964). "Hypothermia in Bacteremic Shock". Archives of Surgery. 89 (4): 619–629. doi:10.1001/archsurg.1964.01320040035006.
- Attar, S; Boyd, D; Layne, E; McLaughlin, J; Mansberger, AR; Cowley, RA (November 1969). "Alterations in coagulation and fibrinolytic mechanisms in acute trauma". The Journal of Trauma: Injury, Infection, and Critical Care. 9 (11): 939–965.
- Cowley, RA; Hudson, F; Scanlan, E; Gill, W; Lally, RJ; Long, W; Kuhn, AO (December 1973). "An economical and proved helicopter program for transporting the emergency critically ill and injured patient in Maryland". The Journal of Trauma: Injury, Infection, and Critical Care. 13 (12): 1029–1038.
- Trump, BF; Valigorsky, JM; Jones, RT; Mergner, WJ; Garcia, JH; Cowley, RA (July 1975). "The application of electron microscopy and cellular biochemistry to the autopsy: Observations on cellular changes in human shock". Human Pathology. 6 (4): 499–516. doi:10.1016/s0046-8177(75)80068-2.
- DuPriest Jr, RW; Khaneja, SC; Cowley, RA (January 1979). "Acute cholecystitis complicating trauma". Annals of Surgery. 189 (1): 84–89. doi:10.1097/00000658-197901000-00016. PMC 1396953.
- Mackenzie, CF; Shin, B; Fisher, R; Cowley, RA (February 1979). "Two-year mortality in 760 patients transported by helicopter direct from the road accident scene". The American Surgeon. 45 (2): 101–108. PMID 434606.
- Boyd, DR; Cowley, RA (January 1983). "Comprehensive regional trauma/Emergency Medical Services (EMS) delivery systems: The United States experience". World Journal of Surgery. 7 (1): 149–157. doi:10.1007/BF01655923.
- Shorr, RM; Rodriguez, A; Indeck, MC; Crittenden, MD; Hartunian, S; Cowley, RA (February 1989). "Blunt Chest Trauma in the Elderly". The Journal of Trauma: Injury, Infection, and Critical Care. 29 (2): 234–237.
