= Shocktrauma =

- Based on: Shocktrauma by Jon Franklin and Alan Doelp
- Screenplay by: Stephen Kandel
- Directed by: Eric Till
- Starring: William Conrad; Scott Hylands; Linda Sorenson
- Music by: Eric Robertson
- Country of origin: United States
- Original language: English

Production
- Producers: Christopher Dalton; Wayne Fenske
- Running time: 120 minutes
- Production companies: Glen Warren Productions; Telecom Entertainment Inc.

Original release
- Release: October 27, 1982

Shocktrauma is a 1982 television film produced in Canada and syndicated nationally in the United States by sponsor General Foods. The screenplay by Stephen Kandel is based on the book by Jon Franklin and Alan Doelp, which details the true story about Dr R Adams Cowley founder of first trauma center in America, in Baltimore, Maryland. It was directed by Eric Till.

Dick Atkins and Michael Lepiner were the executive producers, with Christopher Dalton and Wayne Fenske as producers. The production stars William Conrad as Dr. R Adams Cowley, the heart surgeon who pioneered trauma care. The film's score was composed by Eric Robertson.

== Cast ==
- William Conrad as Dr. R Adams Cowley
- Philip Akin as Sam Hooke
- Leslie Carlson as Elton Bates
- Jim Chad as John Grady
- Lawrence Dane as Dr. Jordan Tracy
- Scott Hylands as Dr. "Tex" Goodnight
- Patricia Idlette as Nurse Malcolm
- Kerrie Keane as Jill Jackson
- Ken Pogue as Governor
- Linda Sorenson as Elizabeth Scanlan
- Beau Starr as Gene Kowalski
