= University of Maryland Medical Center =

Coordinates: 39.2883°N 76.6236°W

- University of Maryland Medical System

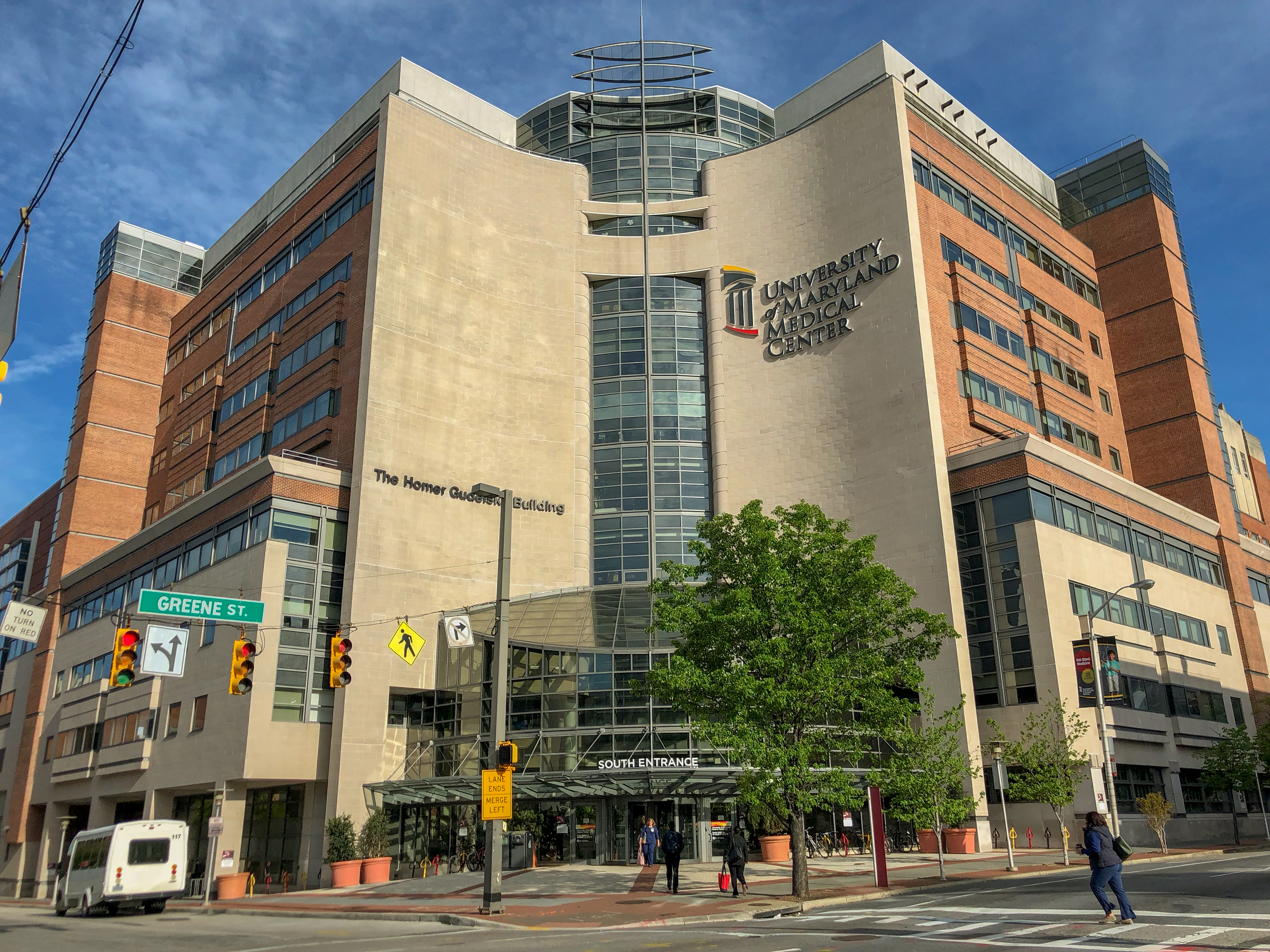

Geography
- Location: 22 S. Greene Street, Baltimore, Maryland, United States

Organization
- Care system: Medicare
- Type: Teaching
- Affiliated university: University of Maryland School of Medicine

Services
- Emergency department: Level I trauma center (see R Adams Cowley Shock Trauma Center)
- Beds: 789

Helipads
- Helipad: FAA LID: MD71

History
- Founded: 1823

Links
- Website: https://www.umms.org/ummc
- Lists: Hospitals in Maryland

The University of Maryland Medical Center (UMMC) is a teaching hospital with 789 beds based in Baltimore, Maryland, that provides the full range of health care to people throughout Maryland and the Mid-Atlantic region. It gets more than 26,000 inpatient admissions and 284,000 outpatient visits each year. UMMC has approximately 9,050 employees at the UMMC Downtown Campus, as well as 1,300 attending physicians and 950 resident physicians across the Downtown and the Midtown campuses. UMMC provides training for about half of Maryland's physicians and other health care professionals. All members of the medical staff are on the faculty of the University of Maryland School of Medicine.

It is part of the University of Maryland Medical System, a private, not-for-profit health system that includes nine acute care, specialty and rehabilitation hospitals as well as outpatient facilities throughout Maryland.

== History ==
The University of Maryland Medical Center is one of the nation's oldest teaching hospitals. It was created in 1823 as the Baltimore Infirmary, which was located on the same site as today's medical center, on the West side of downtown Baltimore.

== Overview ==
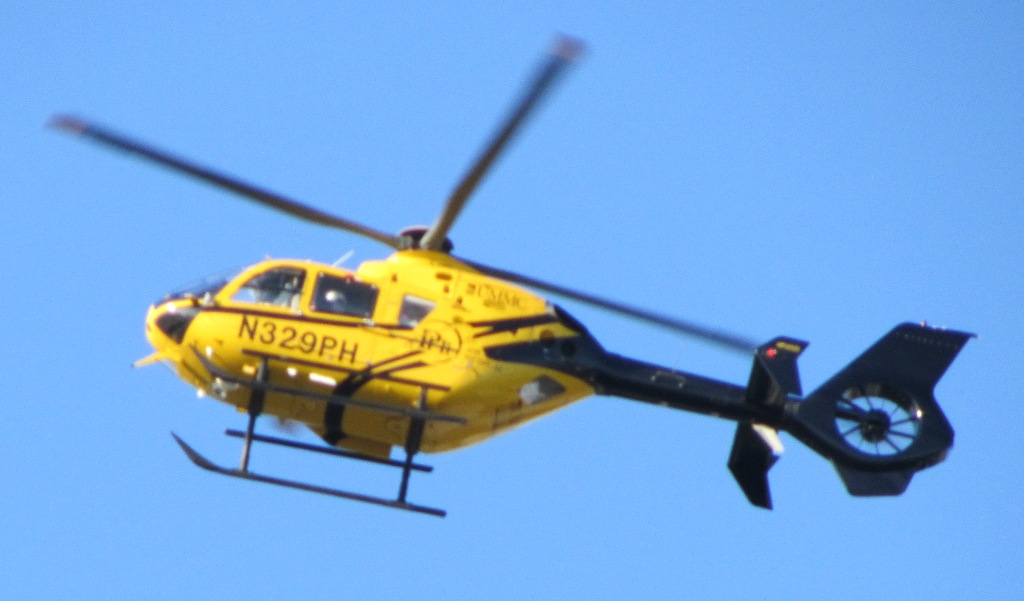
A PHI operated Eurocopter / EC135 is operated as, "ExpressCare-1" for the University of Maryland Medical System

The University of Maryland Medical Center is a major regional referral center for trauma, cancer care, neurocare, cardiac care and heart surgery, women's and children's health and organ transplants. It has one of the nation's largest kidney transplant programs and is known for developing and performing minimally invasive surgical procedures. The University of Maryland Medical Center sponsors multiple residency training programs in primary and specialty care disciplines.

== Facilities ==
The major components of the University of Maryland Medical Center include:

=== R Adams Cowley Shock Trauma Center ===
The R Adams Cowley Shock Trauma Center (also known as Shock Trauma) is the world's first center dedicated to saving lives of people with severe, life-threatening injuries sustained in motor vehicle collisions, violent crimes and other traumatic incidents.

Shock Trauma has more than 100 inpatient beds dedicated to emergency surgery, resuscitation, intensive care, and acute surgical care. The trauma staff treat more than 7,500 critically injured patients each year who arrive by helicopter or ambulance.

It is named after its founder, R Adams Cowley, M.D., who came up with the concept of the "golden hour" — that lives can be saved when trauma patients receive appropriate care within one hour of their injury. Shock Trauma trains physicians and medical personnel from locations overseas and throughout the United States.

=== Greenebaum Comprehensive Cancer Center ===
The University of Maryland Greenebaum Comprehensive Cancer Center (UMGCCC) is designated by the National Cancer Institute as one of the top cancer centers in the country UMGCCC is known for providing coordinated care from teams of specialists—medical oncologists, radiation oncologists, surgical oncologists, pathologists, nurses and other team members who have expertise in particular types of cancer—who consult on each patient's case and develop a joint treatment plan.

UMGCCC also is known as a center with expertise in laboratory and clinical research. UMGCCC researchers actively participate in new drug development, and the center offers more than 100 clinical trials.

In 2024, UMGCCC was named one of the best hospitals for cancer care by U.S. News and World Report.

=== University of Maryland Children's Hospital ===
With 16 locations across Maryland, the University of Maryland Children's Hospital (UMCH) provides care for serious and complex health problems in infants, children, teens, and young adults aged 0–21 and sometimes up until 25 throughout Maryland. UMCH has its own pediatric pharmacy and emergency room, and is also very active in children's health care research.

Special programs and services include a headache clinic, celiac disease program, asthma program, AIDS program, pediatric surgery and neonatal intensive care unit (NICU). Infants born prematurely are transported from around the region to be cared for in the 52-bed NICU — the largest in the state. The Pediatric Intensive Care Unit (PICU) has 19 private rooms where children heal from an array of issues, including major surgery, respiratory failure or acute infection.

In 2024, UMCH was named “Best Children’s Hospital For Neonatology” by U.S. News and World Report. The hospital was also ranked as the second best children's hospital in Maryland.

=== University of Maryland Heart and Vascular Center ===
The University of Maryland Heart and Vascular Center is recognized for its expertise in robotic heart surgery, minimally invasive heart bypass and valve surgery, heart transplants and heart pumps.

The Heart and Vascular Center's specialists treat a full range of heart problems, including heart failure, coronary artery disease, heart rhythm abnormalities, aortic and mitral valve disorders and cardiomyopathy.

The Heart and Vascular Center also emphasizes heart disease prevention by educating patients about lifestyle factors, including proper nutrition and exercise.

=== University of Maryland Division of Transplantation ===
Performing more than 400 organ transplants a year, the University of Maryland Division of Transplantation is one of the nation's largest transplant programs with a reputation for expertise in treating patients who need kidney, pancreas, liver, lung or heart transplants.

The Division of Transplantation is known for its living kidney and living liver donor programs, as well as laparoscopic kidney donation, curing insulin dependency through simultaneous pancreas-kidney transplantation, three-artery kidney transplant, transplanting HIV-positive and hepatitis-C positive patients, domino liver transplants, simultaneous bilateral kidney transplant for polycystic kidney disease (PKD) and simultaneous heart and liver transplantation.

== Notable cases ==
In January 2022, researchers and clinicians at UMMC successfully transplanted a genetically modified pig heart into a 57-year-old man, David Bennett Sr., for the first time in history.

== Awards ==
The University of Maryland Medical Center's (UMMC) Ear, Nose, and Throat (ENT) division has earned the title of best hospital for ENT care by U.S. News and World Report for seven consecutive years (2017-2024).

In 2024, UMMC also earned its fourth consecutive Magnet Designation from the American Nurses Credentialing Center (ANCC). Nationally, 10% of hospitals have earned the gold standard, and 2% have earned it at least four times.
