= Claudio J. Schonholz =

Claudio J. Schonholz (born 1956 in Buenos Aires, Argentina) is an interventional radiologist, the first in the United States to perform minimally invasive aortic aneurysm surgery (stent graft procedure) together with Drs. Frank Veith, Juan C. Parodi and Michael L. Marin.

== Education ==
Schonholz was born in Buenos Aires, Argentina. He attended the National College of Buenos Aires and graduated with honors from the University of Buenos Aires in 1980. Following it, he did residency in diagnostic radiology as well as in angiography and interventional radiology at the Centre Cardiologuique du Nord in Paris, France. While there, he worked with professors Michel Tonnelier and Francis Besse and helped them with the development of digital subtraction angiography.

== Career ==
Dr. Schonholz eventually became private practitioner in his hometown with a team of physicians that specialize in interventional cardiology and neurosurgery. During one such days, Schonholz and his colleague, Luis Augusto Lemme Plaghos, introduced many neurointerventional procedures in Argentina such as brain embolization to cure arteriovenous malformation.

In 1989, Schonholz met with Juan C. Parodi in a nearby hospital where Parodi worked as a vascular surgeon. Dr. Parodi suggested him to join his project on stent graft which he plans to use on patients who are in higher risk of developing abdominal aortic aneurysms. Knowing Dr. Schonholz's work on carotid angioplasty, they merged forces in 1990 and became the first team of physicians to use stent graft to treat a human with abdominal aortic aneurysm. The novel procedure was performed at the Buenos Aires Cardiovascular Institute, and was later proven to be innovative and minimally invasive. Their invention was so unique to the world, that Dr. Schonholz and his team were invited to Nancy, France where they met with Michel Henry and Max Amor and demonstrated their invention at the 2nd International Course of Peripheral Vascular Intervention.

In 1992, Schonholz and his team went to the Montefiore Medical Center at Albert Einstein College of Medicine in New York where they joined Frank Veith and Michael L. Marin to perform first stent graft procedure in the United States. In 2000, Schonholz joined the Department of Radiology at Louisiana State University and later became its director of vascular and interventional radiology. Four years later, Dr. Schonholz joined the faculty of the Department of Radiology of the Medical University of South Carolina in Charleston, South Carolina where he still works at its Heart and Vascular Center.
