= One Stop Wide Awake surgery =

One Stop Wide Awake (OSWA) - Surgical Model - United Kingdom

One Stop Wide Awake (OSWA) is a surgical model which was initially developed for hand surgery in the United Kingdom. It is recognized as effective by the Royal Society of Medicine.

The model centres on complete surgical care within one management stop, and with reduced risks due to the avoidance of general anesthesia, regional anaesthesia, sedation, and tourniquets. This approach to surgery is particularly cost-effective and efficient. It enables complex procedures such as for Dupuytren's contracture to be performed as outpatient procedures under local anaesthesia.

With the changes in UK healthcare commissioning and the evolution from primary care trusts to clinical commissioning groups from 2013, this model of surgery is likely to be increasingly important, and may secure the funding of some NHS surgical services.
