= Wilhelm Müller (disambiguation) =

Wilhelm Müller (1794–1827) was a German lyric poet

Wilhelm Müller may also refer to

- Wilhelm Max Müller (1862–1919), American orientalist, grandson of the poet
- Wilhelm Müller (handballer) (1909–1984), German handballer
- Wilhelm Müller (physicist) (1880–1968), German physicist
- Wilhelm Müller (rower), Swiss rower
