= Frank Veith =

American vascular surgeon (born 1931)

- Born: 1931
- Education: M.D., Cornell University Medical School (1955); Vascular surgery fellowship, Harvard Medical School (1963)
- Occupation: Vascular surgeon
- Medical career
- Institutions: Cleveland Clinic New York University Medical Center

Frank J. Veith is an American vascular surgeon who serves as Professor of Surgery, New York University Medical Center NY, NY and Professor of Surgery Cleveland Clinic Lerner College of Medicine of Case Western Reserve University, Cleveland, OH. He was the first vascular surgeon in the United States to perform minimally invasive aortic aneurysm surgery (stent graft procedure) together with Drs. Michael L. Marin, Juan C. Parodi and Claudio J. Schonholz.

Dr. Veith hosts the international VEITHsymposium, one of the largest conferences for vascular surgeons, interventional radiologists, interventional cardiologists and other vascular specialists.

== Education ==
Veith graduated from Cornell University Medical College in 1955, completed his residency at Peter Bent Brigham Hospital, Harvard Medical School 1956–63 and served as Captain, U.S. Army Medical Corps and Chief, Surgical Service, U.S. Army Hospital, Fort Carson, Colorado 1960–62.

== Career ==
Frank J. Veith is Professor of Surgery, at New York University Medical Center NY, NY and Professor of Surgery, Cleveland Clinic Lerner College of Medicine of Case Western Reserve University, Cleveland, OH. He also is the William J. von Liebig Chair in Vascular Surgery at the Cleveland Clinic Foundation.

Veith has authored or coauthored more than 1,000 original articles and chapters in medical journals, particularly on limb-salvage surgery and more recently the field of endovascular grafting for traumatic, aneurysmal and occlusive arterial disease.

In 2010, Frank J. Veith received the Lifetime Achievement Award from the Society for Vascular Surgery (SVS), the highest honor for its members for their leadership and industry contributions.

== Memberships and fellowships ==
Veith is a Fellow of the American College of Surgeons and in the past had served as chairman of the American Board of Vascular Surgery, president of the regional Eastern and New York Vascular Societies, and served as the 50th president of the Society for Vascular Surgery.
