= William H. Muller Jr. =

American cardiologist (1919–2012)

William Henry Muller, Jr. M.D. (August 19, 1919 – April 19, 2012) was an American Doctor of Medicine and a prominent cardiologist who was the first surgeon to implant an artificial aortic valve. He was the longtime Chairman of the Department of Surgery at the University of Virginia and past president of the American College of Surgeons.

A native of Dillon, South Carolina he attended the McCallie School in Chattanooga, Tennessee; he received a bachelor's degree from The Citadel in 1940 and graduated from Duke University School of Medicine in 1943. Following this, he did an internship at Johns Hopkins Hospital. He served in the United States Army for a brief time in 1946 before returning home to his father in Dillon, SC who was extremely ill. He was deployed to Berlin, Germany and became a captain. Upon his return he became a general surgery resident at Johns Hopkins. In 1949, he was recruited to the new UCLA School of Medicine, where he served as the chief of cardiovascular surgery.

In 1954, he was recruited to the University of Virginia to chair the department of surgery as surgeon-in-chief. He held this position for almost 30 years, and also served as Vice President for Health Affairs and CEO of the University of Virginia Health System. He established the open heart surgery program at UVA. He retired from the university in 1990.

He served as presidents of the American Surgical Association, the Society of University Surgeons, and the Society for Vascular Surgery, and as vice-chairman of the American Board of Surgery. He received the Distinguished Alumnus Award from Duke University, and the Research Award and the Thomas Jefferson Award from the University of Virginia. He was also recipient of Honorary Doctorates from The Citadel and the Medical University of South Carolina.

He married Hildwin Headley, a nurse at Johns Hopkins in Baltimore, MD, in 1946. They had three children: William III, Marietta, and John. He had nine grandchildren. He was an skilled woodworker by hobby.
