= Society for Vascular Surgery =

American academic society for vascular surgery

- Founded: 1947
- Type: Academic society
- Legal status: 501(c)(3) organization
- Website: https://vascular.org/

The Society for Vascular Surgery (SVS) an American academic society for vascular surgery. Its mission includes education, research, career development and advocacy. The SVS is the national organization for more than 6,000 vascular surgeons and other medical professionals involved in the prevention and cure of vascular disease. The association was founded in 1947. The SVS is the sponsor organization for the Journal of Vascular Surgery (JVS) and for the national Vascular Annual Meeting (VAM).

== History ==
The Society for Vascular Surgery was founded in 1947 as the Society for Cardiovascular Surgery. The society changed its name to the Society for Vascular Surgery in 1953 to reflect its focus on vascular disease.

In the early years of the society, the focus was primarily on the surgical treatment of arterial occlusive disease. However, over time, the scope of the society's work expanded to include the treatment of all types of vascular disease.

== Organization ==
The Society for Vascular Surgery is a professional medical society that represents vascular surgeons in the United States and around the world. The society has over 5,500 members, including vascular surgeons, trainees, and allied health professionals. The society is governed by a board of directors, which is made up of elected members of the society.

The society has several committees that are responsible for various aspects of the society's work, including research, education, advocacy, and quality improvement. The society also has a foundation, the SVS Foundation, which funds research into vascular disease and advocates for improved patient care.

The Society for Vascular Surgery develops clinical practice guidelines for the diagnosis and management of vascular disease. The society's guidelines are developed by expert panels, based on the best available evidence, and are designed to help healthcare providers make informed decisions about the care of patients with vascular disease.

The SVS publishes of the Journal of Vascular Surgery and its associated co-journals. In addition, the society also has an active Patient Safety Organization and Vascular Quality Improvement program.

=== Journal of Vascular Surgery ===
JVS is a subscription based, peer reviewed academic journal published by Elsevier. It has been in circulation since 1984 and has published several of the most notable academic papers in the field of vascular surgery. The journal publishes original research articles, review articles, case reports, and editorials related to the diagnosis, treatment, and prevention of vascular diseases. In 2013, JVS had an impact factor of 2.98. In 2014, JVS launched an additional journal, "JVS: Venous and Lymphatic Disorders".

In addition to the JVS, the SVS also publishes several co-journals:

- Journal of Vascular Surgery: Venous and Lymphatic Disorders - focuses on the diagnosis, treatment, and prevention of venous and lymphatic diseases.
- Journal of Vascular Surgery: Cases and Innovative Techniques - showcases original case reports, technical notes, and surgical innovations.
- Journal of Vascular Surgery: Vascular Innovations- explores the epidemiology, prevention, and treatment of vascular diseases on a global scale.

=== SVS Patient Safety Organization ===
The SVS Patient Safety Organization (PSO) was established in 2011 as a response to the growing need for improved patient safety in vascular surgery. The PSO is dedicated to improving patient outcomes and reducing medical errors by collecting and analyzing data on adverse events and near misses in vascular surgery. The PSO provides its members with tools and resources to promote a culture of safety and to reduce the risk of medical errors. The organization also conducts research and provides educational programs focused on patient safety.

=== Vascular Quality Improvement Program ===
The SVS Vascular Quality Improvement Program (VQI) was established in 2011. The VQI is a national registry that collects and analyzes data on the outcomes of vascular surgeries performed at participating institutions. The registry enables participating institutions to track their own performance and compare it to national benchmarks. The VQI provides feedback to participating institutions to help them improve patient outcomes and reduce the risk of medical errors. In addition, the VQI conducts research and provides educational programs focused on improving the quality of vascular surgery.

== Structure ==
The SVS is governed by a Board of Directors and is supported by a number of committees, task forces, and sections. The Board of Directors is responsible for setting the strategic direction of the society and overseeing its operations. The committees, task forces, and sections are responsible for carrying out specific functions and activities of the society. These include activities such as education, research, advocacy, and quality improvement. The society also has regional chapters and international affiliates that provide additional support to its members.

The SVS offers educational programs and resources for its members. These include the SVS Vascular Annual Meeting and online educational resources, including webinars, podcasts, and online courses.

=== List of presidents ===
1940s

- 1947 Alton Ochsner, MD
- 1948 Arthur W. Allen, MD
- 1949 Emile Holman, MD

1950s

- 1950 Daniel Elkin, MD
- 1951 Ross Veal, MD
- 1952 Alfred Blalock, MD
- 1953 Geza de Takats, MD
- 1954 Michael DeBakey, MD
- 1955 Robert Linton, MD
- 1956 George Lilly, MD
- 1957 Arthur Blakemore, MD
- 1958 Frank Gerbode, MD
- 1959 Harris B. Shumaker, Jr., MD

1960s

- 1960 Richard Warren, MD
- 1961 Julian Johnson, MD
- 1962 F.A. Simeone, MD
- 1963 Earle B. Mahoney, MD
- 1964 Richard L. Varco, MD
- 1965 John Heysham Gibbon, MD
- 1966 Clarence Dennis, MD
- 1967 William H. Muller Jr., MD
- 1968 Wilfred Gordon Bigelow, MD
- 1969 C. Rollins Hanlon, MD

1970s

- 1970 W. Sterling Edwards, MD
- 1971 F. Henry Ellis, Jr., MD
- 1972 Andrew G. Morrow, MD
- 1973 Wiley F. Barker, MD
- 1974 W. Andrew Dale, MD
- 1975 Russell M. Nelson, MD
- 1976 Worthington G. Schenk, MD
- 1977 Jesse E. Thompson, MD
- 1978 James A DeWeese, MD
- 1979 F. William Blaisdell, MD

1980s

- 1980 Edwin J. Wylie, MD
- 1981 John A. Mannick, MD
- 1982 H. Edward Garrett, MD
- 1983 D. Emerick Szilagyi, MD
- 1984 John J. Bergan, MD
- 1985 Anthony M. Imparato, MD
- 1986 Allan D. Callow, MD
- 1987 Wesley S. Moore, MD
- 1988 E. Stanley Crawford, MD
- 1989 D. Eugene Strandness, Jr., MD

1990s

- 1990 William J. Fry, MD
- 1991 Calvin B. Ernst, MD
- 1992 Malcolm O. Perry, MD
- 1993 James S.T. Yao, MD
- 1994 Norman R. Hertzer, MD
- 1995 Thomas J. Fogarty, MD
- 1996 Frank Veith, MD
- 1997 James C. Stanley, MD
- 1998 William M. Abbott, MD
- 1999 Christopher Zarins, MD

2000's

- 2000 Jonathan B. Towne, MD
- 2001 Ramon Berguer, MD
- 2002 Thomas F. O’Donnell, MD
- 2003 Jack L. Cronenwett, MD
- 2004 Richard Green, MD
- 2005 Gregorio A. Sicard, MD
- 2006 Enrico Ascher, MD
- 2007 K. Craig Kent, MD
- 2008 K. Wayne Johnston, MD
- 2009 G. Patrick Clagett, MD

2010's

- 2010 Anton N. Sidawy, MD
- 2011 Robert M. Zwolak, MD
- 2012 Richard P. Cambria, MD
- 2013 Peter Gloviczki, MD
- 2014 Julie Ann Freischlag, MD
- 2015 Peter F. Lawrence, MD
- 2016 Bruce A. Perler, MD
- 2017 Ronald M. Fairman, MD
- 2018 R. Clement Darling III, MD
- 2019 Michel Makaroun, MD

2020s

- 2020 Kim J. Hodgson, MD
- 2021 Ronald L. Dalman, MD
- 2022 Ali AbuRahma, MD
- 2023 Mike Dalsing, MD
- 2024 Joseph Mills, MD
