= R Adams Cowley Shock Trauma Center =

Trauma hospital in Baltimore, Maryland, U.S.

Coordinates: 39°17′17″N 76°37′28″W

- University of Maryland Medical System

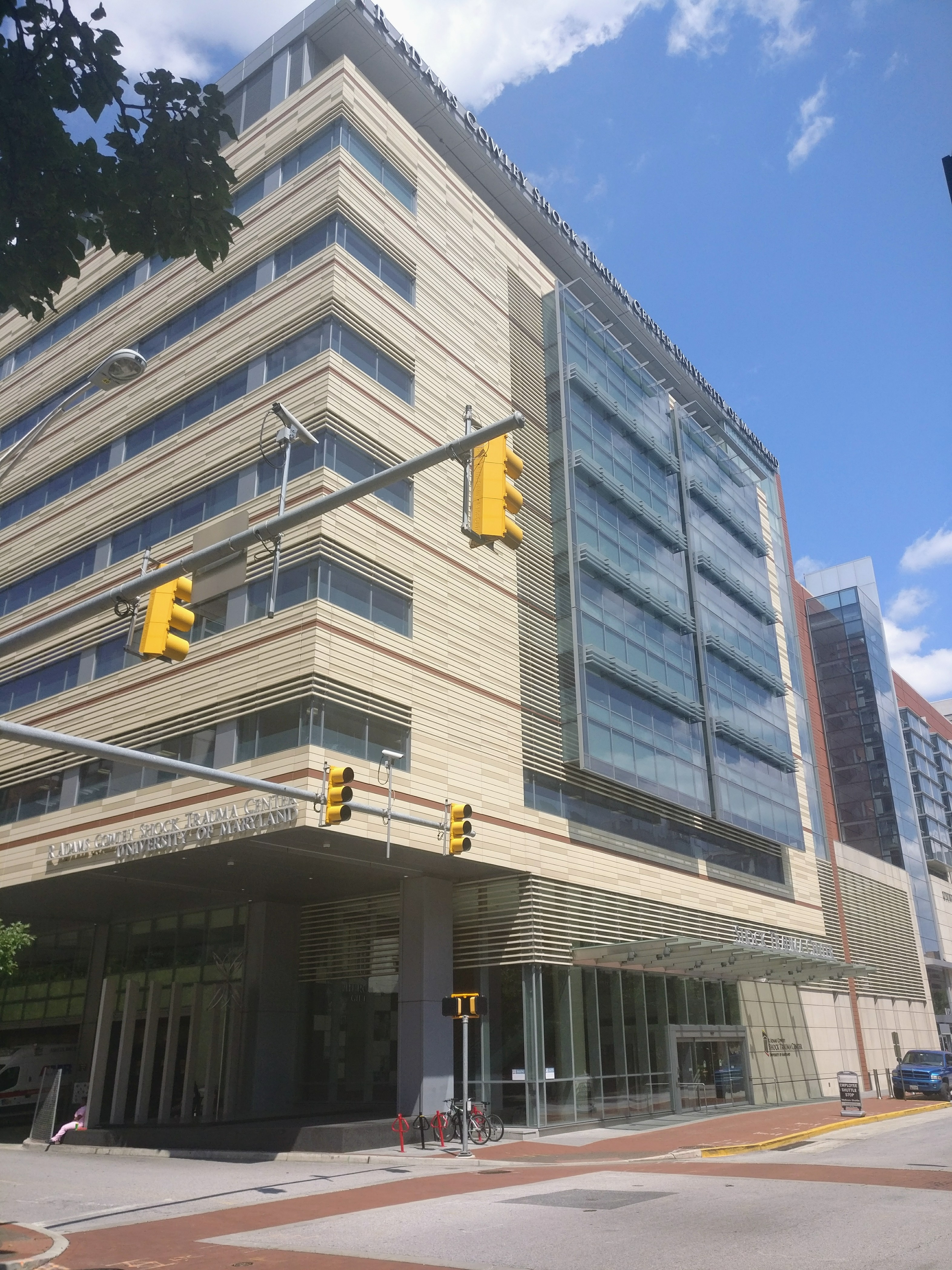

Geography
- Location: Baltimore, Maryland, U.S.

Organisation
- Care system: Private, Medicare, Medicaid
- Type: Specialist
- Affiliated university: University of Maryland School of Medicine

Services
- Emergency department: Level I trauma center Primary Adult Resource Center (PARC)
- Beds: 100+
- Speciality: Trauma

History
- Founded: 1960

Links
- Website: umm.edu/shocktrauma
- Lists: Hospitals in U.S.

R Adams Cowley Shock Trauma Center (also referred to as Shock Trauma) is a trauma hospital in Baltimore, Maryland and is part of the University of Maryland Medical System. Shock Trauma was founded by R Adams Cowley, considered the father and major innovator of trauma medicine. He developed the first clinical shock trauma unit in the nation.

== Early years ==
While serving in the United States Army in France immediately following World War II, Cowley observed that many severe traumatic injuries could be stabilized if the patient could be transported to a military hospital where a surgeon was present within one hour of the initial injury. Cowley coined the term "golden hour" to describe this crucial period of time. Cowley thus lobbied the legislature in Maryland to purchase helicopters for the transport of trauma patients to expedite their arrival to these higher-care facilities. The Maryland legislature initially denied his request, due to the cost of helicopters, but he was subsequently able to persuade the State of Maryland to purchase helicopters by agreeing to the premise they be shared with the Maryland State Police. Today, almost all major trauma centers in the United States utilize helicopters to transport trauma patients to the hospital.

During the establishment of trauma centers in the early 1970s, Cowley fought to change the prevailing policy of first responders taking all patients, including traumas, to the "nearest hospital first." According to Cowley, the major flaw to this system was that the nearest hospital was most likely not capable of treating severe trauma.

In 1975, Dutch Ruppersberger, a young prosecutor was involved in a nearly fatal automobile accident and had his life saved largely in part to being transported directly to University of Maryland's Shock Trauma Center. When Ruppersberger asked Cowley what he could do to repay him for saving his life, Cowley responded, "Run for office so you can help us get the resources we need to continue saving lives.” Ruppersberger successfully ran for numerous local, state, and federal elective offices all the while advocating for shock trauma. The policy of "nearest hospital first" was eventually abandoned, and emergency medical systems across the United States now follow the model first advocated by Cowley.

== Facilities ==
Shock Trauma houses over 100 inpatient beds dedicated to emergency surgery, resuscitation, intensive care, and acute surgical care. The facility has a dedicated resuscitation area with more than 13 beds. The Trauma Resuscitation Unit (TRU) is located on the building's second floor. Helicopters and ambulances bring injured patients directly to the TRU for emergency treatment and stabilization. Specialized trauma teams composed of trauma surgeons and emergency medicine physicians triage and treat patients as they arrive by helicopter and ambulance. Teams of consultants are available 24/7 and include orthopedic surgeons, neurosurgeons, vascular surgeons, plastic and reconstructive surgeons, radiologists, anesthesiologists, and others. Shock Trauma is an academic institution and emergency-medicine residents, trauma fellows, anesthesiology and surgical residents are involved in all aspects of patient care and evaluation. A large team of trauma physician assistants, nurse practitioners, nurses, and technicians complete the trauma team personnel and stand ready to receive victims 24 hours a day, 365 days per year. The helipad at Shock Trauma can accommodate up to four medevac helicopters at one time and has direct elevator access to the resuscitation area several stories below.

Shock Trauma has nine dedicated operating suites, its own unique trauma post-anesthesia care unit, in addition to two dedicated multislice CT scanners, an angiography suite, and digital plain film capability. The inpatient wards of the Shock Trauma center consist of specialized intensive-care units, intermediate-care units, and regular surgical-floor beds. Shock Trauma can admit patients directly into the operating room if their condition requires it. Intensive care units at the center include dedicated units for victims of multi-system and neurosurgical trauma.

In 2013, Shock Trauma Center completed and opened a major expansion to the facility. Around 68 patient rooms were renovated to conform with modern-day standards.

== Education ==
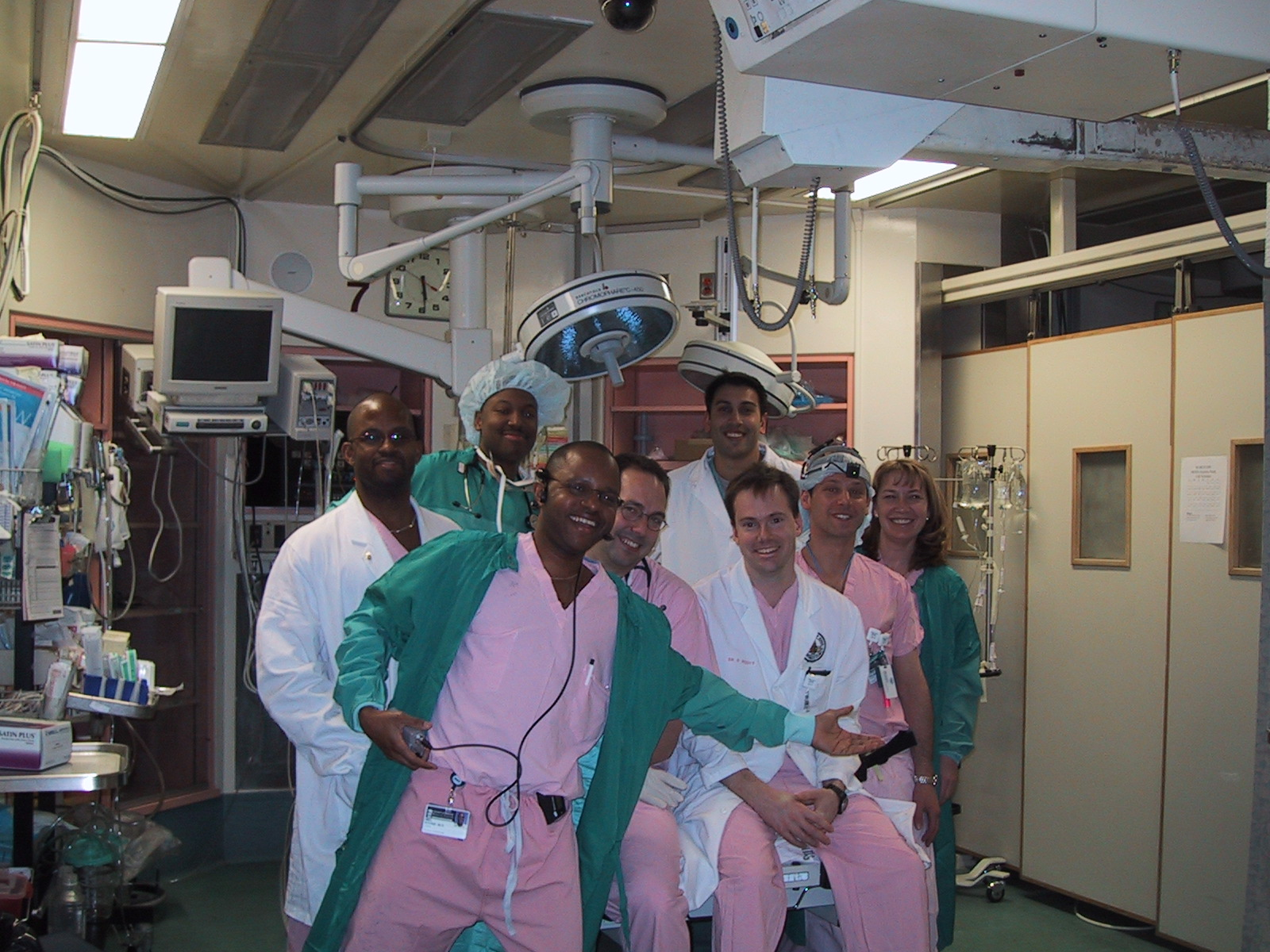
Shock Trauma Resident Team in 2001

Shock Trauma trains physicians and medical personnel from locations overseas and throughout the United States. In addition to training residents at the University of Maryland itself, the facility hosts emergency-medicine and surgery residents from all over the United States and Canada. Visiting residents include physicians from Mayo Clinic, Dartmouth, Henry Ford, and Georgetown. Shock Trauma receives over 6300 admissions per year and provides its residents with intensive training in the evaluation and management of both blunt and penetrating injury.

Shock Trauma's educational mission extends beyond the training of future physicians. The facility hosts members of the United States Armed Forces, in addition to providing education for local emergency-medical service providers.

== Television ==

The television docudrama series The Critical Hour: Shock Trauma and Shock Trauma: Edge of Life, which both aired on Discovery Life, were filmed at R Adams Cowley Shock Trauma Center.

== Movie ==
In 1982, a television movie was produced by Telecom Entertainment and Glen Warren Productions about Cowley, his discovery of "The Golden Hour" and his crusade to establish the first fully dedicated trauma center in the world. The movie starred William Conrad as Dr. Cowley. It was syndicated in United States on October 27, 1982.

== Scrubs ==
Dr. Cowley chose pink scrubs to conserve money during the trauma center's inception due to them being unpopular among staff, making them less likely to be stolen. It is now a part of the standard attire for people working in Shock Trauma.
