= Fadiman =

Fadiman is a surname. Notable people with the surname include:

- Anne Fadiman (born 1953), American writer and journalist
- Clifton Fadiman (1904–1999), American editor, writer, radio host and television personality
- Dorothy Fadiman (born 1939), American documentary film director
- James Fadiman (born 1939), American psychologist and writer
- Maria Fadiman (born 1969), American botanist
