= Cosmos and Psyche =

2006 book by Richard Tarnas

Cosmos and Psyche: Intimations of a New World View
- Cover of the first edition
- Author: Richard Tarnas
- Language: English
- Subject: Astrology
- Publisher: Plume
- Publication date: 2006
- Publication place: United States
- Media type: Print (hardcover and paperback)
- Pages: 569
- ISBN: 978-0-452-28859-1

Cosmos and Psyche: Intimations of a New World View is a 2006 book by cultural historian Richard Tarnas, in which the author proposes the existence of relationships between planetary transits and events in the lives of major historical figures, as well as cultural events.

== Summary ==
Tarnas's first book, The Passion of the Western Mind serves as an introduction to Cosmos and Psyche. Tarnas acknowledges that astrology's status in contemporary thought is, as he puts it, "the gold standard for superstition".

The book's objective is to challenge the materialistic and dysteleological assumptions of the modern world view, and to set forth evidence for a correspondence between planetary alignments and patterns of human history. The book attempts to provide an archetypal cosmology to accompany Tarnas's proposed participatory epistemology, "in which human beings are regarded as an essential vehicle for the creative selfunfolding of reality".

The idea for Cosmos and Psyche began when Tarnas realized that the climax of the 1960s cultural revolution took place precisely during the only Uranus-Pluto conjunction in the 20th century. For Tarnas, the characteristics of the astrological entity Uranus match with those of the Greek mythical figure Prometheus better than with those of the conservative mythological figure Uranus. Tarnas associates the astrological planet Uranus with freedom and change, while Pluto is associated with evolution, instinct, and eros. Thus in Tarnas's theory, the apparent relationships (conjunctions, oppositions, and squares) of Uranus and Pluto have momentous potential for human history. (Tarnas's research has not found significant correlation between the zodiac signs and human events.) Tarnas further observed that a Uranus-Pluto opposition occurred during the French Revolution. Like the 1960s, the French Revolution featured the characteristics of Uranus-Pluto alignment: revolution through the manifestation of the suppressed. These historical-astrological coincidences or synchronicities led Tarnas to further explore the relationship of pivotal moments in Western cultural history to the conjunctions, oppositions, and squares of the outer planets. The historical events analyzed include the Reformation, the Renaissance, Romanticism, the Scientific Revolution, the Industrial Revolution, Modernism, Postmodernism, etc.

In the book Tarnas discusses the correspondences between planetary transits and the biographies of such figures as Friedrich Nietzsche, William Blake, Walt Whitman, and Arthur Schopenhauer. Tarnas believes that the correspondences between historical events and astrological alignments are consistently astonishing.

Tarnas uses C. G. Jung's concept of synchronicity, or meaningful coincidence, to argue that there is an acausal connection between the outer world and the human psyche.

Tarnas does not argue for a causal relationship between the planets and human events:

In the perspective I am suggesting here, reflecting the dominant trend in contemporary astrological theory, the planets do not "cause" specific events any more than the hands on a clock "cause" a specific time. Rather, the planetary positions are indicative of the cosmic state or archetypal dynamics at that time.

== Reception ==
In Inside Bay Area, Esther Fields opined that "...[n]ot only does it challenge modern assumptions about how the world works, but it also points the way toward a new way of understanding your place in the cosmos...and shows how we are on the brink of world changes as great as those of the time of Galileo and Copernicus." Anthroposophist Frederick Dennehy opined in Lilipoh magazine that "Tarnas’ deeply radical hypothesis is that the disenchantment of the modern universe is unreal – the result of a “simplistic epistemology” and moral positioning totally inadequate to the depths, complexity and grandeur of the cosmos."

Thomas Meaney panned Cosmos and Psyche in The Wall Street Journal, writing that the premise may sound "like an elaborate joke". Calling it "unadulterated crack-pottery", he wrote that Tarnas's observations were vacuous, opining that they "...drain human events of meaning rather than fill them with significance."

In The Observer, astrologer Neil Spencer favorably contrasted Tarnas's book Cosmos and Psyche to the writings of Richard Dawkins:

'In effect, the objective world has been ruled by the Enlightenment, the subjective world by Romanticism,' Richard Tarnas says in his remarkable book Cosmos & Psyche, an attempt to heal that schism, to 're-enchant' the cosmos and redeem what he calls the 'pathos' of the modern condition. By contrast, Dawkins' one-eyed view turns reason, as Blake warned, into the enemy of imagination and of art.

John Heron critiqued the methodology and conclusions of Cosmos in the journal Network Review, describing 18 internal problems with Tarnas' theory. In the following issue of Network Review, Keiron Le Grice responded point-by-point to Heron's critique. Rob Brezsny, American astrologer, opined that Cosmos and Psyche is "the definitive astrology book of the 21st century – probably the 20th century, too." In Tikkun magazine Jordi Pigem opined,

In the last ten years, landmark works...have been reflecting and kindling a growing awareness that nature is not merely a sum of molecules obeying physical and chemical laws, but a living, sensuous, and ensouled matrix in which we fully participate and belong. Tarnas' Cosmos and Psyche extends this rising awareness beyond the bounds of the biosphere. Our psyche is not only deeply connected with our immediate natural environment, but with the whole of the cosmos encompassing us, with the rhythms of the planets we can see above us on clear nights. Searching beneath the depths of the psyche, Tarnas has found the heights of the cosmos. Cosmos and Psyche may radically transform the way we see cultural and political history, individual life journeys, and our sense of participation in the universe.

Daniel Pinchbeck, writing in Reality Sandwich, opined that Cosmos was "scrupulously researched and carefully argued", and that it advances "a radical thesis...which seeks to revive astrology as a serious intellectual discipline and provide a cosmological missing link between the human world and the greater universe in which we are embedded." Pinchbeck writes that Cosmos may offer "a transformative matrix for reconceiving our relationship to the cosmos."

== See also ==
- Participatory theory
