= The Passion of the Western Mind =

1991 book by Richard Tarnas

The Passion of the Western Mind: Understanding the Ideas That Have Shaped Our World View
- Cover of the first edition, featuring Thomas Cole's 1840 painting, The Architect's Dream
- Author: Richard Tarnas
- Language: English
- Subject: Western philosophy
- Publisher: Ballantine Books
- Publication date: 1991
- Publication place: United States
- Media type: Print (Hardcover and Paperback)
- Pages: 544
- ISBN: 0-345-36809-6

The Passion of the Western Mind: Understanding the Ideas That Have Shaped Our World View is a 1991 book by the cultural historian Richard Tarnas.

== Summary ==
Tarnas argues that the movement from the Greek and Christian world views, through modernity and to postmodernism can be seen as a natural and dialectical unfolding of a collective mind or psyche. Tarnas outlines the intellectual-cultural development of the modern world view from its origins in Greek and Judaeo-Christian mythologies. He then argues that with the advent of postmodernism, the modern world is in a serious spiritual crisis, which manifests as the global ecological crisis. He proposes that a potential resolution, which he calls the participatory framework, has also been in development in the West for centuries.

Tarnas first describes the ancient world view, in which the self is undifferentiated from the world-soul in a participation mystique. The rise of the great monotheistic religions began with the Axial Age in the sixth century BCE. In monotheistic religion, God is transcendent. The cosmos became a de-sacralized object, which is no longer imbued with divinity and meaning. Mankind began to see the world as an objective reality which can be studied by science and manipulated with technology. The human subject, on the other hand, became empowered, liberated, and autonomous.

With the Scientific Revolution, and subsequent secularization of Europe, the overwhelming success of science and technology eroded belief in the existence of the transcendent God. Eventually, mankind became disenchanted with and alienated from the world. 20th century man tended to find spirituality in modern psychology rather than in traditional religion. Finally, in postmodern thought, meaning is seen as projected onto or constructed in an empty, meaningless world.

Thus the modern condition begins as a Promethean movement toward human freedom, toward autonomy from the encompassing matrix of nature, toward individuation from the collective, yet gradually and ineluctably the Cartesian-Kantian condition evolves into a Kafka-Beckett-like state of existential isolation and absurdity--an intolerable double bind leading to a kind of deconstructive frenzy.

The contemporary world of postmodern thought, according to Tarnas, is caught "between the inner craving for a life of meaning and the relentless attrition of existence in a cosmos that our rational scientific world view has assured us is empty, dead, devoid of all purpose."

The great irony suggested here of course is that it is just when the modern mind believes it has most fully purified itself from any anthropomorphic projections, when it actively construes the world as unconscious, mechanistic, and impersonal, it is just then that the world is most completely a selective construct of the human mind. The human mind has abstracted from the whole all conscious intelligence and purpose and meaning, and claimed these exclusively for itself, and then projected onto the world a machine. As Rupert Sheldrake has pointed out, this is the ultimate anthropomorphic projection: a man-made machine, something not in fact ever found in nature. From this perspective, it is the modern mind's own impersonal soullessness that has been projected from within onto the world--or, to be more precise, that has been projectively elicited from the world.

Tarnas' proposed way out of this "Cartesian-Kantian epistemological box" involves a participatory epistemology: a theory of knowledge in which "human beings are regarded as an essential vehicle for the creative self-unfolding of reality." According to Tarnas, the participatory framework takes into account the critical insights of modernism and postmodernism, while repairing the ontological separateness of the psyche and the cosmos, which are, in the participatory framework, synthesized in a dialectical hieros gamos, or sacred marriage.

This participatory epistemology, developed in different ways by Goethe, Hegel, Steiner, and others, can be understood not as a regression to naive participation mystique, but as the dialectical synthesis of the long evolution from the primordial undifferentiated consciousness through the dualistic alienation. It incorporates the postmodern understanding of knowledge and yet goes beyond it. The interpretive and constructive character of human cognition is fully acknowledged, but the intimate, interpenetrating and all-permeating relationship of nature to the human being and human mind allows the Kantian consequence of epistemological alienation to be entirely overcome.

== Reception ==
The Passion of the Western Mind became a bestseller, selling over 200,000 copies by 2006. It "became a staple in some college curriculums". It gave Tarnas' work international respect and was hailed as an important work by Joseph Campbell, Huston Smith, Stanislav Grof, John E. Mack, Stanley Krippner, Georg Feuerstein, David Steindl-Rast, John Sculley, Robert A. McDermott, Jeffrey Hart, Gary Lachman, and others. According to Christopher Bache, Passion is "[w]idely regarded as one of the most discerning overviews of Western philosophy from the ancient Greeks to postmodern thought." Jorge Ferrer wrote that it contained a "devastating assault on the Cartesian-Kantian paradigm."

In 1996 Nobel laureate Ilya Prigogine approvingly quoted Tarnas in a paper entitled "Science, Reason, and Passion". The paper discussed the idea that contemporary science appears to have started overcoming the duality which separates humans from nature.

What can man do in a deterministic universe in which he is a stranger? This is the anxiety expressed in so many recent writings, like those of...Richard Tarnas, who writes "For the deepest passion of the Western mind has been to reunite with the ground of its being." I believe this is true, and that our period is indeed one of reunification, of a quest for unity—witness the deep interest in nature shown by so many young people today, and man's growing sense of solidarity with all living beings.

In his 2000 book Wandering God: A Study of Nomadic Spirituality, cultural critic Morris Berman called The Passion of the Western Mind: "a fairly decent summary of European intellectual history, written in a lucid and accessible style". Berman then wrote that Tarnas "argues for a biological mysticism", and called Tarnas' theory escapist, regressive, totalitarian, and utopian.

In papers posted to the Shambhala Publications website in 2003, Ken Wilber called Tarnas a "boomeritis theorist", and criticized him for using Abraham Maslow as a "whipping boy", for allegedly misusing Thomas Kuhn's concept of the paradigm, and for allegedly engaging in "hermeneutic violence" by using a metanarrative which denies hierarchical stages. However, contrary to one of Wilber's claims, Tarnas only mentions Maslow once in Passion, and in a non-critical context.

In the 2007 Jack Canfield book, You've got to read this book: 55 people tell the story of the book that changed their life, Jim MacLaren described how he encountered Passion in a bookstore after recovering from an accident which had rendered him a quadriplegic. MacLaren wrote that Passion "triggered a desire to understand my own belief system and how it connected to the universal issues of being human". Passion inspired MacLaren to go to graduate school to study world religions, mythology, and depth psychology.

Fadil Jatkar won a 2012 King Abdullah Prize for translation in the Humanities for his translation of Passion into Arabic.

== See also ==
- Participatory theory
