= Jorge Ferrer =

Spanish-American scholar and psychologist

Jorge N. Ferrer
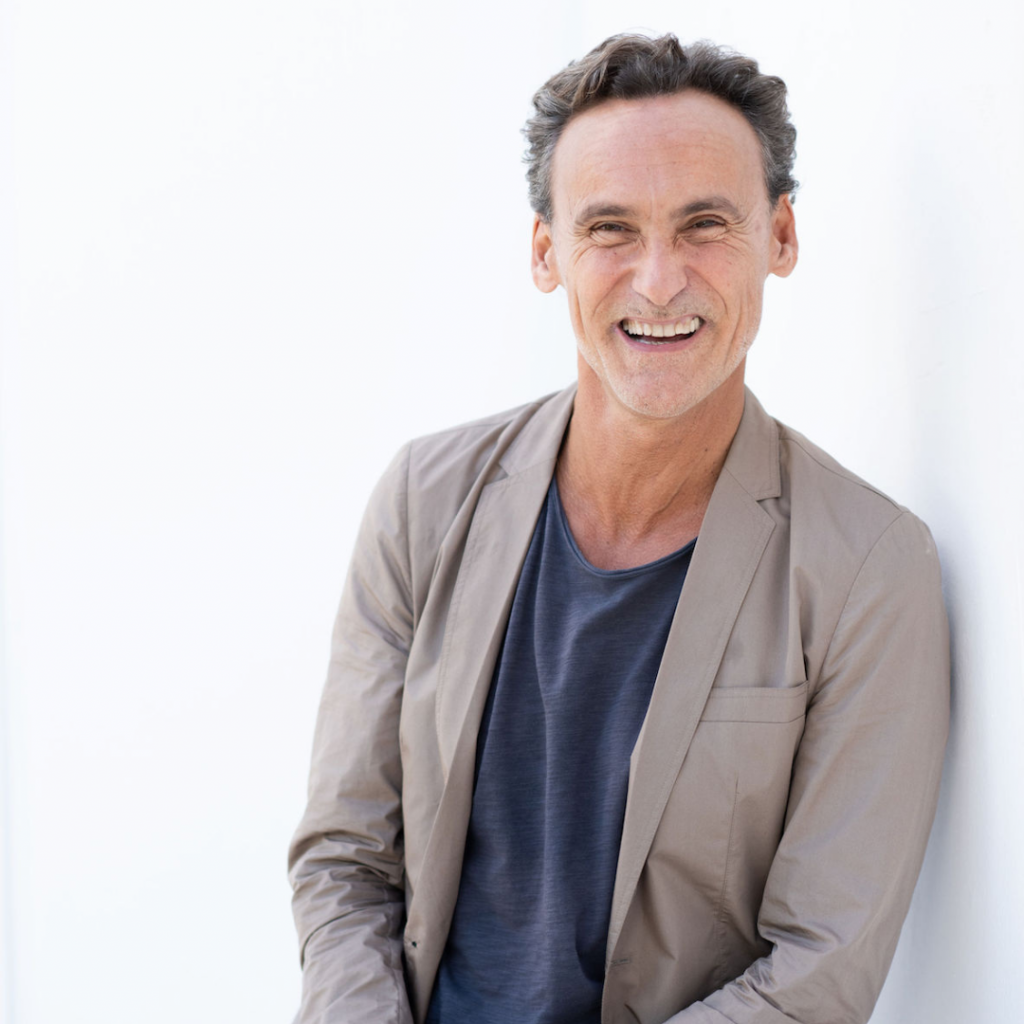
- Born: Barcelona, Spain

Academic background
- Education: University of Barcelona / Cardiff University (BA/PhDc); California Institute of Integral Studies (PhD)

Academic work
- Discipline: Transpersonal psychology, Philosophy of religion, Consciousness studies
- Institutions: California Institute for Human Science; California Institute of Integral Studies
- Main interests: Enactivism, Religious pluralism, Relationship studies
- Notable works: Revisioning Transpersonal Theory (2001); Participation and the Mystery (2017); Love and Freedom (2021)
- Notable ideas: Participatory approach to religious pluralism, Novogamy, Embodied spiritual inquiry
- Website: www.jorgenferrer.com

Jorge N. Ferrer (born October 30, 1968) is a Spanish-American psychologist who wrote about the applications of participatory theory to transpersonal psychology, religious studies, integral education, and sexuality and intimate relationships.

Ferrer is a research faculty member at California Institute for Human Science (CIHS), San Diego, and former professor of psychology at California Institute of Integral Studies (CIIS), San Francisco, where he served as chair of the department of East-West Psychology.

== Biography ==
Born in Barcelona, Spain, Ferrer obtained a degree in clinical psychology in 1991 from University of Barcelona, studying his last year as an Erasmus scholar at Cardiff University (Wales, United Kingdom), where he was awarded the George Westby Prize for best essays written by an undergraduate student. Upon his return to Barcelona, the university and Research Commission of the Catalonian Council granted Ferrer a Research Training Fellowship (FPI) to carry out doctoral research on the "Electrophysiological and Hemispheric After-Effects of Mindfulness Meditation". After completing the empirical part of his doctoral research in 1993, Ferrer traveled to the US to pursue another Ph.D. degree at California Institute of Integral Studies (CIIS) under the "la Caixa" Foundation Fellowship Program. In 1998, he began teaching at both CIIS and Institute of Transpersonal Psychology, and in 2000 he became core faculty at CIIS.

Ferrer is one of the architects of second-wave transpersonalism, which stresses the pluralistic, relational, and inquiry-driven dimensions of spiritual practice and knowing with a participatory approach to religious pluralism.

His participatory pedagogy is the focus of Yoshiharu Nakagawa and Yoshiko Matsuda's Transformative Inquiry: An Integral Approach, an anthology of writings based on Ferrer's teaching at Ritsumeikan University in Kyoto, Japan.

In 2000, Ferrer received the Fetzer Institute's Presidential Award for his seminal work on consciousness studies.

From 2000 to 2010, he was a scholar at the Esalen Center for Theory and Research, Esalen Institute, California.

In 2009 he was selected to become an advisor to the organization Religions for Peace at the United Nations on a research project aimed at solving global interreligious conflict.

In 2010, the American Academy of Religion Annual Meeting in Atlanta, Georgia, featured a panel on his co-edited anthology, The Participatory Turn.

In 2023, he was invited to deliver a TEDx talk on alternative intimate relationships at the inauguration of TEDxDaltVila in Ibiza, Spain.

== Major works and ideas ==
He sees central for our times "the emergence of a more feminine and organic spirituality, as well as the recovery of the authentically feminine". His first book, Revisioning Transpersonal Theory, was published in 2001 shortly after a preview by Tarnas arguing that the book represented a "new birth in freedom" for transpersonal psychology.

In 2008 Ferrer coedited with Jacob H. Sherman The Participatory Turn, an anthology where they brought participatory thinking to bear on critical issues of contemporary religious studies. Ferrer and Sherman were joined in these efforts by influential scholars of religious studies such as William B. Barnard, William C. Chittick, Lee Irwin, Beverly Lanzetta, and Donald Rothberg.

In 2017 Ferrer published Participation and the Mystery, applying his participatory approach to a variety of disciplines and critical issues, from integral practice to the question of supernatural claims, from entheogenic visions to the graduate teaching of mysticism, and from religious pluralism to integral education.

Ferrer's book Love and Freedom (2022) is focused on the area of sexuality and intimate relationships. In the same way that the transgender movement deconstructed the gender binary, Ferrer proposed that a parallel step should be taken with the monogamy/polyamory relational style binary. He coined the term novogamy to refer to a diverse array of relational options beyond the mono/poly binary.

== Reception and criticism ==
The publication of Revisioning Transpersonal Theory in 2001 proved to be catalytic for the development of the so-called second-wave transpersonalism, which stresses the embodied, embedded, diverse, and transformative aspects of human spirituality. In the foreword, Tarnas framed Ferrer's participatory approach as the second conceptual stage of the paradigm shift initiated by Abraham Maslow's and Stanislav Grof's launching of the discipline of transpersonal psychology. Both Gregg Lahood and Edward Dale considered participatory pluralism as shaping the prevalent growing force in transpersonal scholarship in the twenty‑first century, after Ken Wilber's hierarchical neo‑perennialism and the East‑West synthesis of the 1960s and 1970s that spawned the birth of transpersonal psychology.

Ferrer's ideas have often been discussed and debated (sometimes heatedly) within the pages of various peer-reviewed academic journals, including Journal of Consciousness Studies, International Journal of Transpersonal Studies, and Journal of Transpersonal Psychology. The harshest criticisms came from Wilber and his students. In October 2001, a month before the publication of Revisioning, Wilber suggested that Ferrer—together with figures such as Richard Rorty, Jean Baudrillard, Edward Said, and the late Wittgenstein—was responsible for the cultural confusion leading to the 9/11 terrorist attacks. Daryl Paulson claimed that anything of value in the book had been already said by Wilber, and the rest was, citing a personal communication from Wilber, "a condensation of three decades of postmodern wrong turns … Ferrer's book basically marks the end of the transpersonal movement." One year later, however, Paulson retracted these views, stating: "When I first read this book I hated it, but I have read and studied it for 2 years and find it one of the best books ever written on transpersonal psychology."

In addition, Wilber wrote an essay charging Revisioning with falling into a performative contradiction (i.e., critiquing hierarchical rankings while upholding the superiority of its own approach) and promoting what he called a flatland where no qualitative distinctions can be made. Ferrer responded stating that these critiques do not apply to his work. He argued that although his proposal does not privilege any tradition or type of spirituality on doctrinal, objectivist, or ontological grounds (i.e., saying that theism, monism, or nondualism corresponds to the nature of ultimate reality or is intrinsically superior), it does offer criteria for making qualitative distinctions on pragmatist and transformational grounds.

In the context of religious studies, Ferrer's "participatory turn" has so far had a moderately significant impact, receiving positive reviews in both peer-reviewed academic journals and culturally impacting magazines. A review by Ellen Goldberg in Sophia described the book thus: "offers a sophisticated and complex look at an emerging orientation that will continue to be part of the internal dialogue within religious studies. As such, Ferrer and Sherman provide a timely contribution that is thoughtful and worthy of debate within the academy for many years to come."

A review by Ann Gleig in Alternative Spirituality and Religion Review said:

Editors Jorge N. Ferrer and Jacob H. Sherman … impressively articulate an emerging academic ethos in the field of religious studies that challenges the prevalent methodological dominance of the cultural-linguistic paradigm and its reduction of religious phenomena to language and culture … If you … fancy yourself as something of a gnostic scholar this book is a must read. It will also be of significant interest to anyone wanting to keep abreast of the latest theoretical twists and methodological trends in the academic study of religion.

In the UK, a review by Chris Clarke in Network Review: Journal of the Scientific and Medical Network said: "The Participatory Turn … present[s] a powerfully convincing picture of what may be the most significant philosophical turn since Kant." In addition, the Buddhist scholar Douglas Duckworth published a paper in Sophia presenting participatory pluralism as a less sectarian alternative to Tibetan Buddhist inclusivism. He wrote:

His [Ferrer's] most significant contribution may be in illustrating what a "nonsectarian" stance might look like in a contemporary, religiously diverse world. While doing so, he shows us what is lost, and what is gained, if we adopt such a truly "nonsectarian" or pluralist stance: what we stand to lose is our particular version of a determinate ultimate truth and a fixed referent of what the end religious goal looks like; what we stand to gain is the real possibility of a transformative dialogue with different traditions, and a new, open relation to the world, ourselves, and each other.

The cultural philosopher Jay Ogilvy suggested that Ferrer's "new polytheism" represented not only a "spirituality that does justice to the multi‑cultural condition of a globalized world", but also the best response to the criticisms of religion crafted by the so‑called new atheists such as Richard Dawkins, Daniel Dennett, or Sam Harris. More practically, it has been argued not only that Ferrer's participatory theory can explain the phenomenon of multiple religious identity, but also that "framing spiritual identity as a participatory event ... can generate possibilities for a Buddhist‑Christian dialogue less constrained by ... doctrinal, ontological, and anthropological tensions."

=== Later scholarly work and influence ===
The participatory approach remains a subject of active scholarly debate, particularly concerning its metaphysical foundations. Critical discussion has centered on whether the approach harbors a "crypto-perennialist" universalist bias or remains "metaphysically vague". Scholars such as Michael Daniels and Glenn Hartelius have defended the framework against these charges. In response to his critics, Ferrer has characterized the metaphysics of the participatory approach as "open-ended and minimalist", arguing that its conception of "the mystery" is consistent with contemporary cosmological knowledge and practically fruitful for both transpersonal psychology and interreligious relations.

Ferrer's work has continued to expand beyond its ongoing impact on transpersonal studies to influence diverse academic and practical fields. In religious studies, his framework has been used to expand traditional religious ideals, articulate embodied liberation in Buddhist modernism, and reinterpret Pentecostal theology. His participatory approach has also been discussed in the context of comparative mysticism, religious pluralism, and contemplative research methods. Other developments include applications to psychotherapy practice, addiction recovery, psychedelic research and ministry, and participatory cosmology. His work has further contributed to contemporary consciousness studies and led to an increase in transpersonal research production.

In the area of sexuality and intimate relationships, Ferrer's proposal of "novogamy" has become an established term within the field of relationship studies and the broader sociological study of polyamory and gender. Additionally, his work on jealousy and its relationship with the Buddhist concept of compersion (mudita) has been discussed and expanded upon by other scholars.

== Bibliography ==
=== Books by Ferrer ===
- Revisioning Transpersonal Theory: A Participatory Vision of Human Spirituality. State University of New York Press, 2002.
- The Participatory Turn: Spirituality, Mysticism, Religious Studies. Edited by Ferrer and Jacob H. Sherman. State University of New York Press, 2008.
- Participation and the Mystery: Transpersonal Essays in Psychology, Education, and Religion. State University of New York Press, 2017.
- Love and Freedom: Transcending Monogamy and Polyamory. Rowman & Littlefield, 2022.
- Novogamia: Más Allá de la Monogamia y del Poliamor. Oberon/Anaya, 2022.

== See also ==
- Transpersonal psychology
