= Transpersonal =

Psychological theory

The transpersonal is a term used by different schools of philosophy and psychology in order to describe experiences and worldviews that extend beyond the personal level of the psyche, and beyond mundane worldly events.

== Definition and context ==
The transpersonal has been defined as experiences in which the sense of identity or self extends beyond (trans) the individual or personal to encompass wider aspects of humankind, life, psyche or cosmos. On the other hand, transpersonal practices are those structured activities that focus on inducing transpersonal experiences.

In the Textbook of Transpersonal Psychiatry and Psychology, Scotton defined the term as "development beyond conventional, personal or individual levels." It is associated with a developmental model of psychology that includes three successive stages: the prepersonal (before ego-formation), the personal (the functioning ego), and the transpersonal (ego remains available but is superseded by higher development).

One of the founders of the field of transpersonal psychology, Stanislav Grof, has defined transpersonal states of awareness as such: "The common denominator of this otherwise rich and ramified group of phenomena is the feeling of the individual that his consciousness expanded beyond the usual ego boundaries and the limitations of time and space."

The term is related to the terminology of peak experience, altered states of consciousness, and spiritual experiences. ^{Note a} The term is also associated with psychedelic work, and psychotechnologies, that includes research with psychedelic plants and chemicals such as LSD, ibogaine, ketamine, peyote, ayahuasca and the vast variety of substances available to all human cultures throughout history.^{Note b}

== Etymology ==
The term has an early precedent in the writing of philosopher William James, who used the term "Trans-personal" in one of his lectures from 1905. However, this early terminology, introduced by James, had a different meaning than the current one and its context was philosophy, not psychology, which is where the term is mostly used these days.

There has also been some speculation of an early precedent of the term in the writings of Carl Jung, as a result of the work of Jung's translators. It regards the Jungian term ueberpersonlich, used by Jung in a paper from 1917, which in later English translations appeared as superpersonal, and later, transpersonal. ^{Note c} In a later, revised, version of the Psychology of the Unconscious (1942) there was even a chapter heading called "The Personal and the Collective (or Transpersonal) Unconscious".

However, the etymology, as it is currently used in academic writing, is mostly associated with the human potential movement of the 1960s and the founders of the field of transpersonal psychology; Anthony Sutich, Abraham Maslow and Stanislav Grof. According to Vich all three had used the term as early as 1967, in order to describe new ideas in the field of Psychology. In 1968 the term was selected by the founding editors of the Journal of Transpersonal Psychology, Abraham Maslow and Anthony Sutich, in order to represent a new area of psychological inquiry.^{Note d} Porter locates the start of the so-called transpersonal psychology movement to the American West Coast in the late 1960s. In addition to Maslow, Vich and Grof the movement was associated with the names of Ken Wilber, Frances Vaughan, Roger Walsh and Seymour Boorstein.

According to Powers the term "transpersonal" starts to show up in academic journals from 1970 and onwards. The use of the term in academic literature is documented in Psychological Abstracts and Dissertations Abstracts. The use of the term grew during the 1970s and 1980s and stabilized in the 1990s.

== Movement ==
The collective of people and organizations with an interest in the transpersonal is called the transpersonal movement. Walsh and Vaughan defines the transpersonal movement as the interdisciplinary movement that includes various individual transpersonal disciplines.

The philosophy of William James, the school of psychosynthesis (founded by Roberto Assagioli), and the analytical school of Carl Jung are often considered to be forerunners to the establishment of transpersonal theory. However, the start of the movement is associated with the emergence and growth of the related field of humanistic psychology. Several of the academic profiles of the early transpersonal movement, such as Abraham Maslow and Anthony Sutich, had their background in humanistic psychology.

The formative years of the transpersonal movement can be characterized by the founding of a few key organizations and institutions, such as: Transpersonal Institute in 1969, the Institute of Noetic Sciences in 1973, The International Transpersonal Psychology Association in 1973, Naropa Institute in 1974, and the California Institute of Transpersonal Psychology in 1975. The California Institute of Transpersonal Psychology later emerged as the Institute of Transpersonal Psychology (ITP) and is today known as Sofia University.

Contemporary transpersonal disciplines include transpersonal psychology, transpersonal psychiatry, transpersonal anthropology, transpersonal sociology and transpersonal ecology. Other academic orientations, whose main focus lies elsewhere, but that are associated with a transpersonal perspective, include humanistic psychology and near-death studies. Contemporary institutions include: the Association for Transpersonal Psychology (ATP), the European Transpersonal Psychology Association (EPTA), the International Transpersonal Association (ITA), the Ibero-American Transpersonal Association (ATI) and the European Transpersonal Association (Eurotas). Leading publications within the movement include: the Journal of Transpersonal Psychology, the International Journal of Transpersonal Studies, and the Journal of Transpersonal Research.

== Transpersonal studies ==
Several commentators note how the transpersonal field, and its vision, moved beyond the perspective of psychology and into other transpersonal domains during the 1980s and 1990s. This expansion of the transpersonal concept resulted in an interdisciplinary situation, and a dialogue with such fields as social work, ecology, art, literature, acting, law, business, entrepreneurship, ecopsychology, feminism and education.

In this respect, commentators have suggested that there is a difference between the founding field of transpersonal psychology and a broader field of transpersonal inquiry, transpersonal studies. This differentiation of the transpersonal field has to do with the scope of the subjects under study, and the interest of researchers and theorists.

In their review of transpersonal definitions, published in 1993, Walsh and Vaughan noted that transpersonal studies had grown beyond the founding field of transpersonal psychology. Commenting on the criticisms of transpersonal psychology in the 1980s, Chinen noted how the criticism did not differentiate between transpersonal psychology, on the one hand, and a broad range of popularized transpersonal orientations, on the other. The same line of reasoning was picked up by Friedman, who differentiated between a broad domain of inquiry known as transpersonal studies, and a more narrow field of transpersonal psychology. Both authors argued that the confounding of the two domains resulted in confusion. In a summary of contemporary viewpoints on transpersonal psychology Jorge Ferrer placed transpersonal psychology within the wider "umbrella" known as transpersonal studies.

Among institutions of higher learning that promote transpersonal studies we find Sofia University and California Institute of Integral Studies. In 2012 Sofia University announced that they were expanding their graduate program in order to include transpersonal studies. The new program was named the Graduate School of Transpersonal Studies.

The International Journal of Transpersonal Studies was established in 1981. It is sponsored by the California Institute of Integral Studies and serves as the official publication of the International Transpersonal Association.

== See also ==
- Analytical psychology
- Humanistic psychology
- Near-death studies

== Notes ==
a. Grabovac & Ganesan, 2003: Table 3.
b. See Winkelman & Roberts, 2007: "Part III. Transpersonal Dimensions of Healing with Psychedelic States"
c. John Beebe, San Francisco Jung Institute Library Journal
d. The term was considered to be an improvent upon an earlier term called «transhumanistic».
