= Motherhood by Choice, Not Chance =

Motherhood By Choice, Not Chance
- Directed by: Dorothy Fadiman
- Produced by: Katie Peterson, KTEH, and Dorothy Fadiman
- Music by: Erika Luckett
- Release date: 2004
- Running time: 27 minutes
- Country: United States
- Language: English

Motherhood By Choice, Not Chance is a 2004 documentary film directed by filmmaker, Dorothy Fadiman, which takes key moments from each of the three films from Fadiman's trilogy called, CHOICE: From the Back-Alleys to the Supreme Court & Beyond, by weaving together selected scenes and interviews. The film comes in two versions, the Activist and Educational. A Spanish Activist version was also created called, Maternidad por Elección, No por Obligación, with an introduction by Dolores Huerta.

Of making the film, Dorothy Fadiman said, "After six years in production, I realized that the 2.5 hour series was too long to show in most setting, such as meetings or classrooms. Working with a core member of my production team, Katie Peterson, we put together Motherhood by Choice, a film based on the most powerful and provocative moments from each of the three films. The result was a half-hour DVD which could easily be shown at conferences, in academic settings and as a highlight of any gathering. While each of the individual films are still shown, many groups find the 30 minute constellation of clips a perfect length."
