= Participatory theory =

Participatory theory is a vision or conceptual framework that attempts to bridge the subject–object distinction. According to Jorge Ferrer, "the kernel of this participatory vision is a turn from intra-subjective experiences to participatory events in our understanding of transpersonal and spiritual phenomena."

== Participatory epistemology ==
A participatory epistemology is a theory of knowledge that holds that meaning is enacted through the participation of the human mind with the world. Originally proposed by Goethe, it has been discussed extensively by cultural historian Richard Tarnas.

In a participatory epistemology, meaning is neither solely objective nor solely subjective. That is to say that meaning is not, per modern or positivist views, found solely outside of the human mind, in the objective world, waiting to be discovered. Nor, per postmodern or constructivist views, is meaning simply constructed or projected onto an inherently meaningless world by the subjective human mind. Rather, Tarnas argues that meaning is enacted through the dialectical participation of the human mind with the larger meaning of the cosmos. Thus meaning exists in potentia in the cosmos, but must be articulated by human consciousness before it exists in actuality.

In this view, the essential reality of nature is not separate, self-contained, and complete in itself, so that the human mind can examine it "objectively" and register it from without. Rather, nature's unfolding truth emerges only with the active participation of the human mind. Nature's reality is not merely phenomenal, nor is it independent and objective; rather, it is something that comes into being through the very act of human cognition. Nature becomes intelligible to itself through the human mind.

According to Tarnas, participatory epistemology is rooted in the thought of Goethe, Schiller, Schelling, Hegel, Coleridge, Emerson, and Rudolf Steiner.

== The "participatory turn" in transpersonal theory ==
In the field of transpersonal psychology, the "participatory turn" endorsed by Jorge Ferrer suggests that transpersonal phenomena are participatory and co-creative events. Ferrer defines these events as "emergences of transpersonal being that can occur not only in the locus of an individual, but also in a relationship, a community, a collective identity or a place." This participatory knowing is multidimensional, and includes all the powers of the human being (body/heart/soul), as understood from a transpersonal framework. Ferrer's vision includes a spiritual reality that is plural and multiple, and a spiritual power that may produce a wide range of revelations and insights, which in turn may be overlapping, or even incompatible.

=== Criticism ===
Ken Wilber argues that participatory epistemology is limited in its appropriate scope to observing the interior of a subjective plural domain. Ferrer argues that Wilber's criticisms of participatory theory have conflated pluralism with vulgar relativism.

== Application in psychoanalysis ==
Psychoanalyst Robin S. Brown has promoted a participatory perspective in the context of relational psychoanalysis as a means to fostering clinical pluralism. Brown adopts a participatory reading of Jungian archetypes as a basis from which to theorize alterity in the clinical situation.

== See also ==
- Participatory action research
- Public participation
- John Heron
- Owen Barfield
- David Skrbina
- Henryk Skolimowski
- Action research
- Michel Bauwens

== Bibliography ==
- Bache, Christopher Dark Night, Early Dawn, 2000; SUNY
- Brown, Robin S. Psychoanalysis Beyond the End of Metaphysics: Thinking Towards the Post-Relational, 2017; Routledge
- Ferrer, Jorge Revisioning Transpersonal Theory, 2002; SUNY
- Ferrer, Jorge & Sherman, Jacob The Participatory Turn: Spirituality, Mysticism, Religious Studies, 2009; SUNY
- Sherman, Jacob Partakers of the Divine: Contemplation and the Practice of Philosophy, 2014; Fortress Press
- Tarnas, Richard Cosmos and Psyche, 2006; Viking
- Tarnas, Richard The Passion of the Western Mind, 1991; Ballantine
