= Historicism (art) =

Art and architecture inspired by historic styles

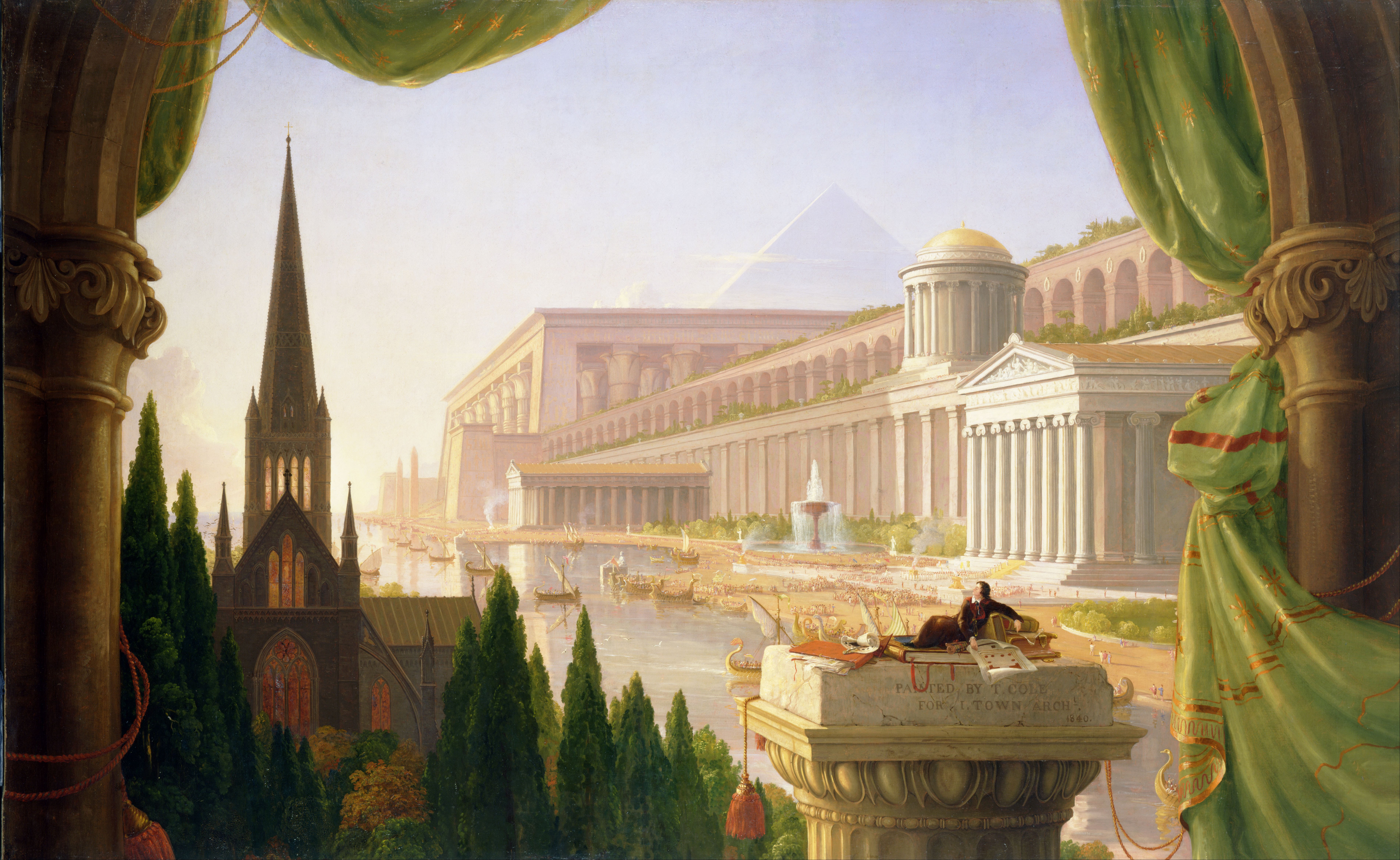
Thomas Cole, The Architect's Dream, 1840

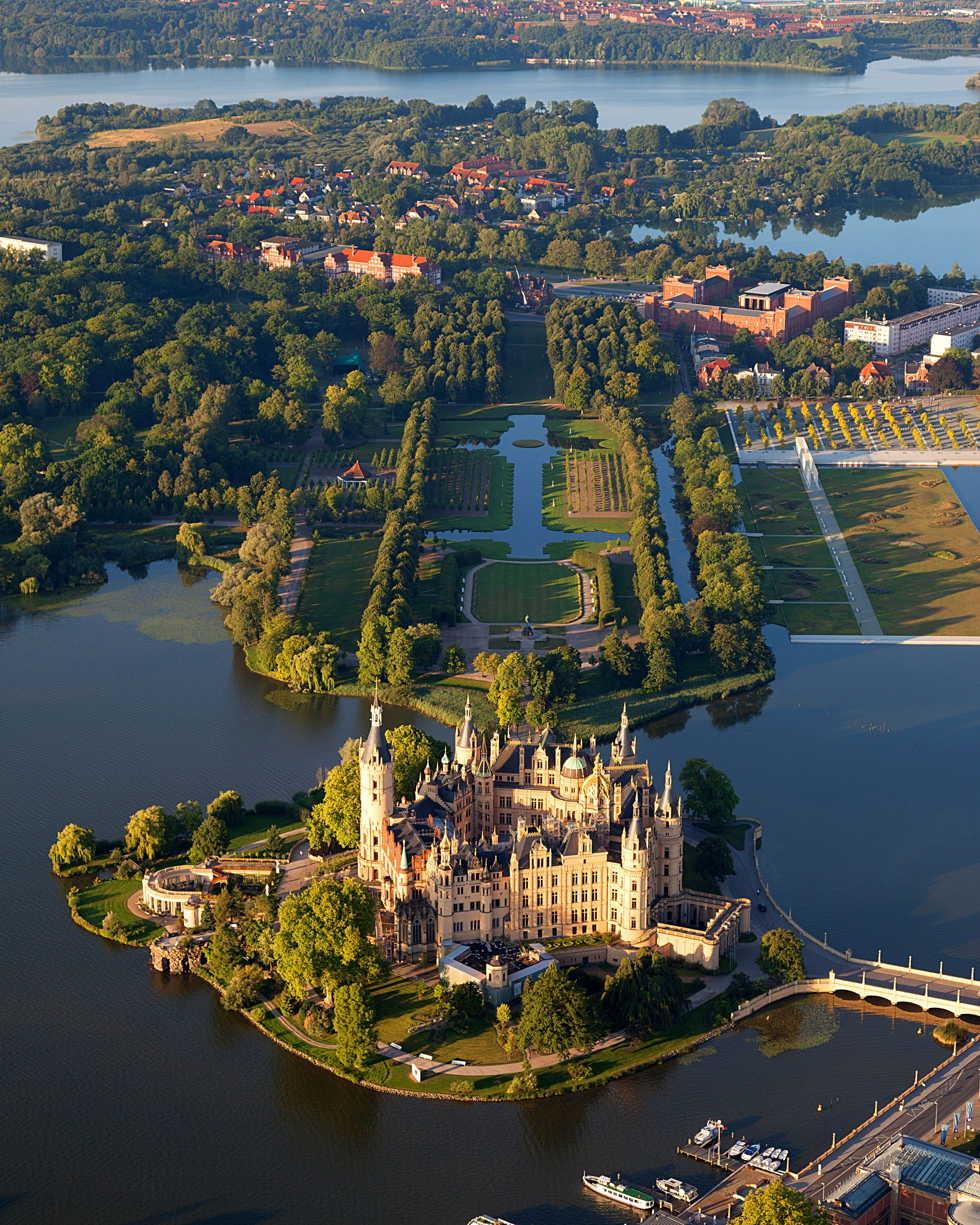
Schwerin Palace, historical ducal seat of Mecklenburg, now seat of state parliament, Mecklenburg Vorpommern, Germany – an example of historicism in architecture

Historicism or historism comprises artistic styles that draw their inspiration from recreating historic styles or imitating the work of historic artists and artisans. This is especially common in architecture, where there are many different styles of Revival architecture, which dominated large buildings in the 19th century. Through a combination of different styles or the implementation of new elements, historicism can create completely different aesthetics than former styles. Thus, it offers a great variety of possible designs.

== Overview ==
In the history of art, after Neoclassicism which in the Romantic era could itself be considered a historicist movement, the 19th century included a new historicist phase characterized by an interpretation not only of Greek and Roman classicism, but also of succeeding stylistic eras, which were increasingly respected. In particular in architecture and in the genre of history painting, in which historical subjects were treated with great attention to accurate period detail, the global influence of historicism was especially strong from the 1850s onwards. The change is often related to the rise of the bourgeoisie during and after the Industrial Revolution. By the end of the century, in the fin de siècle, Symbolism and Art Nouveau followed by Expressionism and Modernism acted to make Historicism look outdated, although many large public commissions continued in the 20th century. The Arts and Crafts style managed to combine a looser vernacular historicism with elements of Art Nouveau and other contemporary styles.

The influence of historicism remained strong until the 1950s in many countries. When postmodern architecture became widely popular during the 1980s, a Neohistorism style followed, that is still prominent and can be found around the world, especially in representative and upper-class buildings.

== Western historicist styles ==
International

- Art Deco
- Art Nouveau
- Baroque Revival
- Beaux-Arts
- Byzantine Revival
- Egyptian Revival
- Gothic Revival
- Greek Revival / Neo-Grec
- Moorish Revival
- Neoclassical
- New Classical / Neohistorism
- Renaissance Revival (Châteauesque/Italianate/Palazzo style)
- Romanesque Revival
- Second Empire
- Swiss chalet style
- Vernacular

British Empire

- Adam style
- Bristol Byzantine
- Carpenter Gothic (Canada)
- Edwardian Baroque
- Indo-Saracenic Revival (India)
- Jacobethan
- Queen Anne style
- Regency
- Scottish baronial style (Scotland, Wales and Northern Ireland)
- Tudor Revival / Black-and-White Revival

France

- Directoire style
- Empire style
- Napoleon III style

Austria and Germany

- Biedermeier
- Gründerzeit
- Nazi architecture
- Resort style
- Rundbogenstil

Greece and Balkans

- Mycenaean Revival
- Serbo-Byzantine Revival

Italy

- Stile Umbertino

Mexico

- Spanish Colonial Revival architecture
- Mayan Revival

Netherlands

- Traditionalist School

Portugal

- Pombaline
- Neo-Manueline
- Soft Portuguese style

Romania

- Romanian Revival

Russian Empire and USSR

- Byzantine Revival
- Russian Revival
- Stalinist architecture

Scandinavia

- Dragestil
- National Romantic style
- Nordic Classicism

Spain

- Neo-Mudéjar
- Noucentisme

United States

- Jeffersonian architecture
- American Renaissance
- Carpenter Gothic
- Collegiate Gothic
- Colonial Revival
- Federal style
- Greco Deco
- Mayan Revival
- Mediterranean Revival
- Mission Revival
- Polish Cathedral style
- Pueblo Revival
- Queen Anne style
- Richardsonian Romanesque
- Spanish Colonial Revival
- Territorial Revival

== See also ==
- Gründerzeit
- Revivalism (architecture)
- Resort architecture (German: Bäderarchitektur) – a specific style of historicism, that is popular on the German Baltic Sea coast
- Academicism
- Musical historicism
