= From Danger to Dignity: The Fight for Safe Abortion =

- Directed by: Dorothy Fadiman
- Produced by: Danny McGuire, Beth Selzer, Daniel Myers, KTEH, and Dorothy Fadiman
- Music by: Erika Luckett
- Release date: 1995
- Running time: 57 minutes
- Country: United States
- Language: English

From Danger to Dignity: The Fight for Safe Abortion is a 1995 documentary film directed by filmmaker, Dorothy Fadiman. The film weaves together two parallel stories: the evolution of underground networks that helped women find safe abortions outside the law, and the efforts by activists and legislators to decriminalize abortion through legislative and judicial channels. This film combines archival footage with interviews that document the efforts of those who fought to change the laws and reduce the stigma which surrounded abortion when it was a crime. The film is the second of the Abortion Rights Film Trilogy.

The film features interviews with Dr. Jane Elizabeth Hodgson, Pat Maginnis, Constance Cook, Sarah Weddington, and archival footage featuring George M. Michaels.

== Reception ==
Booklist called the film "A sterling documentary.".

At the 1997 San Francisco / Northern California Emmy Awards, From Danger to Dignity won the Emmy for documentary.
