= Transpersonal disciplines =

Fields that study the collective worldview's impact beyond individuality

Transpersonal disciplines are academic fields of interest that study the transpersonal.

== Definition and context ==
According to Walsh & Vaughan, who conducted an extensive review on transpersonal definitions, transpersonal disciplines are those disciplines that focus on the study of transpersonal experiences and related phenomena. These phenomena include the causes, effects and correlates of transpersonal experiences and development, as well as the disciplines and practices inspired by them.

== Transpersonal disciplines ==
Among the disciplines that are considered to be transpersonal we find:

- Transpersonal psychology; an area of psychology that studies transpersonal experiences and similar phenomena. The field is supported by a membership organization, the Association for Transpersonal Psychology, and an accompanying journal, the Journal of Transpersonal Psychology. The field also includes the contributions of transpersonal psychotherapy.
- Transpersonal psychiatry; an area of psychiatry with a particular interest in the clinical and biomedical aspects of transpersonal phenomena. Transpersonal psychiatry grew out of transpersonal psychology and is similar to it.
- Transpersonal anthropology; a cross-cultural approach to transpersonal phenomena, associated with the work of Charles Laughlin.
- Transpersonal sociology; the study of the social aspects of the transpersonal. Transpersonal sociology was an important discipline in the formative years of the transpersonal movement and is associated with the early work of Ken Wilber, and the later contributions of Susan Greenwood.
- Transpersonal ecology; the study of the ecological aspects of the transpersonal. The field is associated with the work of Warwick Fox.
- Transpersonal gerontology; the transpersonal perspective on ageing, elders and spiritual development in later life.

Walsh mention other areas of interest that could also be conceptualized as a transpersonal discipline, including exploration of clinical disorders (addiction and spiritual emergencies), and research in fields such as near-death experiences, psychedelics, somatics, philosophy, education and meditation.

== Development of the term ==
In a commentary from 1978, Donald Stone associated the term "transpersonal discipline" with the Human Potential Movement, with its focus on encounter groups, body disciplines and personal growth programs. A few years later Valle and Harari described a number of psychological and philosophical traditions that might be considered to be transpersonal in their orientation, and related these disciplines to the concept of the perennial philosophy. Discussing the dynamics between Humanistic psychology and the emerging field of Transpersonal psychology, the authors summed up the dynamic as the «birth of a transpersonal discipline from humanistic psychology». In 1993 Walsh and Vaughan provided a definition of the term while also relating it more closely to academic categories and disciplines.

The question of whether transpersonal psychology should be considered one of a number of transpersonal disciplines appears to be answered affirmatively by Boucouvalas. Boucouvalas discusses how sociology, anthropology, business studies, law, art, acting and ecology may all gain benefits from a transpersonal focus.

A 2005 edition of the Journal of Transpersonal Psychology discussed transpersonal aspects of cinema, suggesting grounds for a merge between media studies and transpersonal psychology. This journal includes a seminal paper by Gaylinn, arguing that the media is almost inherently transpersonal insofar as it involves addressing a wider community, therefore helping people to transcend their individuality. Gaylinn also discussed how aspects of films can be transpersonal.
