= The Brothers Frantzich =

Singer-songwriter duo

The Brothers Frantzich (/ˈfrænzɪk/ FRAN-zik; Timothy Frantzich, born June 5, 1963, and Paul Frantzich, born November 30, 1966) are a singer-songwriter duo. The brothers have worked together and separately, and with the poets Robert Bly and Coleman Barks, and perform and teach in the United States, United Kingdom and China. They have been writing, recording and performing music since 1996.

== Career ==
Tim and Paul Frantzich were songwriters and members of Minneapolis, Minnesota bands A Few (1984–87), Ruby (1990–1994) and Ride Ruby Ride (1994–1996). As a duo, they use a mix of various Travis picking and strumming techniques to build upon blood harmony tradition, most commonly heard in country music. ("Blood harmony" refers to closely related persons singing together, because their voices often share similar characteristics.) The acoustic duo's approach to harmony singing commonly uses parallel thirds and fifths. Tim's son, Jonah Marais Frantzich, going by a stage name Jonah Marais, is in the band Why Don't We, so Tim divides his time between Minnesota and California. Paul has moved to Colorado and is doing solo performing in addition to performances with his brother.

== Feed Them With Music ==
Paul Frantzich founded the 501(c)(3) non-profit music business "Feed Them With Music" in 2008. The organization contributes to feeding the malnourished globally and domestically, with a small percentage of revenue from live concert ticket sales, artist's merchandise, music downloads and live webcasts. FTWM manages and financially supports a portfolio of global feeding programs. Artists maintain control of their content and receive a portion of profits through FTWM. Paul Frantzich now performs under the name FRAN-ZIK as a solo artist, and resides in the Colorado. In 2011 he released his first independent album titled FRAN-ZIK Feed Them With Music co-produced by his FTWM partner and photographer, Ashley Mosher.

== Discography ==
Discography

- Sibling Revelry (1997)
- Lifescapes – Sailing (1997)
- Lifescapes - Calming Massage (1999)
- Hook 'em, Preach 'em. Set 'em Free (2002)
- Brothers Frantzich LIVE (2003)
- Hymns: Streams of Mercy (2004)
- Harmonium (2004)
- Brothers Frantzich Christmas (2005)
- Heart Wing (2007)
- FRAN-ZIK Feed Them With Music (2011) Paul Frantzick solo
