= Richard Tarnas =

Philosopher and cultural historian

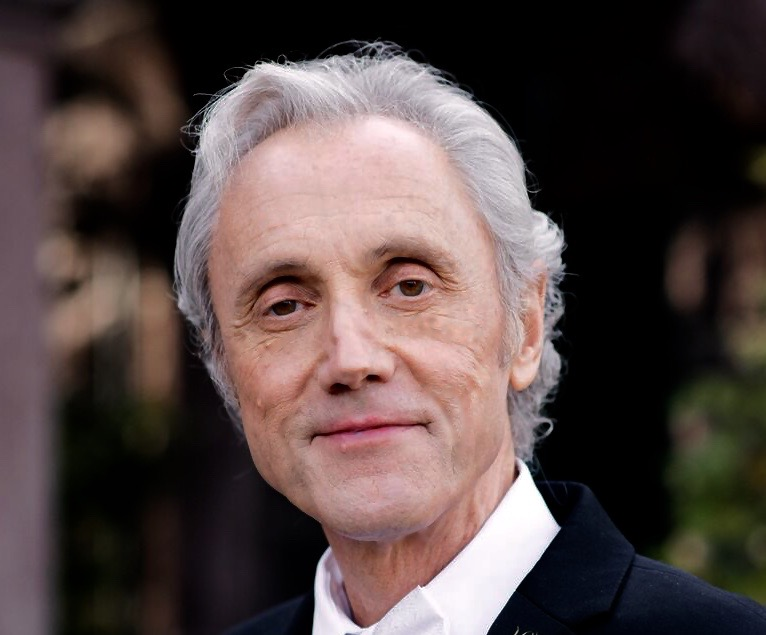
- Born: Geneva, Switzerland

Philosophical work
- Era: Contemporary
- School: Jungian psychology, Participatory theory, Transpersonal psychology
- Institutions: Harvard, Saybrook Institute, Esalen, California Institute of Integral Studies
- Main interests: Archetypal cosmology, Archetypal astrology
- Notable ideas: Participatory epistemology
- Website: www.cosmosandpsyche.com

Richard Theodore Tarnas is a cultural historian and astrologer known for his books The Passion of the Western Mind: Understanding the Ideas That Have Shaped Our World View and Cosmos and Psyche: Intimations of a New World View. Tarnas is professor of philosophy and psychology at the California Institute of Integral Studies, and is the founding director of its graduate program in Philosophy, Cosmology, and Consciousness.

== Biography ==
Tarnas' father, also named Richard Tarnas, worked as a government contract attorney, former president of the Michigan Federal Bar Association, and professor of law. His mother, Mary Louise, was a teacher and homemaker. The eldest of eight children, he grew up in Detroit, Michigan, where he studied Greek, Latin, and the Classics at the University of Detroit Jesuit High School and Academy.

In 1968 Tarnas entered Harvard, graduating with an A.B. cum laude in 1972. He received his Ph.D. from Saybrook Institute in 1976 with a thesis on psychedelic therapy. In 1974 Tarnas went to Esalen in California to study psychotherapy with Stanislav Grof. From 1974 to 1984 he lived and worked at Esalen Institute in Big Sur, California, teaching and studying with Grof, Joseph Campbell, Gregory Bateson, Huston Smith, Elisabeth Kübler-Ross, and James Hillman. He also served as Esalen's director of programs and education. Jeffrey Kripal characterizes Tarnas as both the literal and figurative gate-keeper of Esalen.

From 1980 to 1990, Tarnas wrote The Passion of the Western Mind: Understanding the Ideas That Have Shaped Our World View, a narrative history of Western thought which became a bestseller and remained in use in universities as of 2000. The book was highly acclaimed by Joseph Campbell, Huston Smith, Stanislav Grof, John E. Mack, Stanley Krippner, Georg Feuerstein, David Steindl-Rast, John Sculley, Robert A. McDermott, Jeffrey Hart, Gary Lachman, and others.

Tarnas is the founding director of the Philosophy, Cosmology, and Consciousness program at the California Institute of Integral Studies (CIIS), where he remains a core faculty member as of 2020.

Tarnas' second book, Prometheus the Awakener, published in 1995, focuses on the astrological properties of the planet Uranus, describing "the uncanny way astrological patterns appear to coincide with events or destiny patterns in the lives of both individuals and societies". Tarnas suggests that the characteristics associated with the mythological figure Uranus do not match the astrological properties of the planet Uranus, and that a more appropriate identification would involve the mythological figure Prometheus.

In 2006, Tarnas published his third book, Cosmos and Psyche: Intimations of a New World View. It claims that the major events of Western cultural history correlate consistently and meaningfully with the observed angular positions of the planets. The book received favorable reviews in Tikkun magazine, in an anthroposophical journal, and in the web magazine Reality Sandwich (by Daniel Pinchbeck), but was panned in the Wall Street Journal.

Tarnas featured in the 2006 film Entheogen: Awakening the Divine Within, a documentary about rediscovering an enchanted cosmos in the modern world.

In 2007 a group of fifty scholars and researchers in the San Francisco Bay Area formed the Archetypal Research Collective for pursuing research in archetypal cosmology. An online journal, Archai: The Journal of Archetypal Cosmology, edited by Keiron LeGrice and Rod O'Neal, began a year later, based on the research orientation and methodology established in Cosmos and Psyche. Advisory-board members include Christopher Bache, Jorge Ferrer, Stanislav Grof, Robert A. McDermott, Ralph Metzner, and Brian Swimme. Contributors have included Keiron Le Grice, Richard Tarnas, Stanislav Grof, and Rod O'Neal.

In 2008 Tarnas was invited to address members of the Dutch Parliament about creating a sustainable society.

In 2007 John Cleese and Tarnas gave some public lectures together at the Esalen Institute in Big Sur, California and in Santa Barbara. The lectures discussed regaining a connection to the sacred in the modern world. Cleese and Tarnas then taught a seminar at CIIS called "The Comic Genius: A Multidisciplinary Approach".

American Astronaut Susan Helms cited Tarnas' The Passion of the Western Mind as one of the five 'classic American books' that inspired her career as an astronaut.

== Bibliography ==
=== By Tarnas ===
==== Books ====
- LSD psychotherapy, theoretical implications for the study of psychology, 1976
- Birth and rebirth: LSD, psychoanalysis, and spiritual enlightenment
- The Passion of the Western Mind: Understanding the Ideas That Have Shaped Our World View, 1991; Ballantine (ISBN 0-345-36809-6)
- Prometheus the Awakener: An Essay on the Archetypal Meaning of the Planet Uranus, 1995; Spring Publications, Woodstock, CT (ISBN 0-882-14221-6)
- Cosmos and Psyche: Intimations of a New World View, 2006; Viking (ISBN 0-670-03292-1)

==== Articles ====
- "Uranus and Prometheus" Spring, 1983 psycnet.apa.org
- "The Transfiguration of the Western Mind in Philosophy and the Human Future" Cross currents ISSN 0011-1953, 1989, vol. 39, no3, pp. 258–280 Association for Religion and Intellectual Life, New Rochelle, NY
- "The Transfiguration of the Western Mind" ReVision, 1990
- "The Masculine Mind" Only Connect: Soil, Soul and Society, 1990
- "The Western Mind at the Threshold," The Quest, Summer 1993 (also published in Re-vision, Vol. 16, 1993)
- "The Western World View: Past, Present And Future" in R. E. Di Carlo (Ed.), Towards a New World View: Conversations at the Leading Edge., 1996
- "The Great Initiation", Noetic Sciences Review, Vol. 47, Winter 1998
- "A new birth in freedom: A (p)review of Jorge Ferrer's Revisioning transpersonal theory: A participatory vision of human spirituality" Journal of Transpersonal Psychology, 2001
- R Tarnas, E Laszlo, S Gablik, "The Cosmic World-How We Participate in Thee and Thou in Us" Revision 2001
- Foreword to Revisioning Transpersonal Theory by Jorge Ferrer, 2002; SUNY
- "Two Suitors: A Parable" ReVision: A Journal of Consciousness 2007 Heldref Publications
- "The modern self and our planetary future: a participatory view" symposium De Binnenkant van Duurzaamheid 2008
- "The Planets" Theoretical Foundations of Archetypal Cosmology, 2009 - archaijournal.org
- "The Ideal and the Real" Theoretical Foundations of Archetypal Cosmology 2009
- "World Transits 2000–2020" archaijournal.org

==== Video ====
- Tarnas, Richard; Pacifica Graduate Institute (2006). Jung, Cosmology, and the Transformation of the Modern Self (DVD). Santa Barbara, Calif.: Depth Video. OCLC 642056090. "Recorded at Pacifica Graduate Institute on April 8–9, 2006."

=== About Tarnas ===
- Sean M. Kelly, "The Rebirth of Wisdom" Review of The Passion of the Western Mind by Richard Tarnas The San Francisco Jung Institute Library Journal pp. 33–44 jstor.org

== See also ==
- Participatory theory
- Hermeticism
- List of American philosophers
- Postmodernism
