= Why Do These Kids Love School? =

- Directed by: Dorothy Fadiman
- Narrated by: Dorothy Fadiman
- Music by: Alex De Grassi and Ric Louchard
- Release date: 1999
- Running time: 57 minutes
- Country: United States
- Language: English

Why Do These Kids Love School? is a documentary film directed by filmmaker, Dorothy Fadiman, which examines an independent school, Peninsula School, followed by visits to eight public schools around the country (pre-school through high school) all of which have innovative programs. What emerges is the value of implementing humane values and programs that value creative thinking, self-directed learning, and first-hand experience more than memorization of facts. The schools in the film are Peninsula School, Graham and Parks School in Cambridge, Massachusetts, Central Park East Secondary School in New York City (now a high school since 2005), Clara Barton Open School in Minneapolis, Clement Gregory McDonough City Magnet School in Lowell, Massachusetts, Jefferson County Open School in Lakewood, Colorado, New Orleans Free School (closed after Hurricane Katrina), Central Park East II in New York City, and Davis Alternative Magnet School in Jackson, Mississippi.

Mary Anne Raywid wrote that the film "manages not only to produce a strong emotional impact but also to provide a remarkably intimate look at life inside nine different schools. It successfully conveys a sense of the spirit and personality of the schools portrayed, and it even manages to suggest something of what makes them tick." Alternative Education Resource Organization used the film to explain the term, "Open School" in a glossary about education.

== Awards ==
Blue Ribbon American Film and Video Festival

Best Documentary The "Joeys" San Jose Film Festival

Silver Plaque Chicago Film Festival

Silver Apple National Educational Film and Video Festival 1991 Bronze Star at the WorldFest-Houston International Film Festival

== Screenings ==
- 2001 In Honor of the 75th Anniversary of Peninsula School
- 2009 Peninsula Peace and Justice Center July Screening
- 2010 Bechtel International House Screening April 2010, Stanford University
- 2010 Las Vegas Film Commission with the Las Vegas Peace and Justice Center
