= Moment by Moment: The Healing Journey of Molly Hale =

- Directed by: Dorothy Fadiman
- Narrated by: Dorothy Fadiman
- Release date: 2005
- Running time: 57 minutes
- Country: United States
- Language: English

Moment by Moment: The Healing Journey of Molly Hale is a 2005 documentary film by filmmaker, Dorothy Fadiman, which is about Molly Hale, a woman who suffered a spinal cord injury so severe that attending medical professionals had little hope for the rehabilitation of feeling and movement below her shoulders. The film chronicles Molly's recovery process and the support from her partner and community of friends.

In the Winter of 2002, Molly Hale was chosen to be an Olympic torchbearer by the Olympic Committee.

In May 2010, CultureUnplugged.com showed the film as their main feature for their film festival: Spirit Enlightened.

Molly was a student in Aikido as was shown in the film. She was chosen as a presenter and special trainer for the Self-Defense Instructors' Conference and Special Training of the National Women's Martial Arts Federation in July 2011.
