= Transpersonal psychology =

School of psychology

Transpersonal psychology, or spiritual psychology, is an area of psychology that seeks to integrate the spiritual and transcendent human experiences within the framework of modern psychology.

Evolving from the humanistic psychology movement, transpersonal psychology emerged in the late 1960s, integrating spirituality and consciousness studies into psychological theory, as a response to perceived limitations of mainstream psychological approaches.

The empirical validity and recognition of transpersonal psychology remains contentious in modern psychology. Early critics such as Ernest Hilgard have viewed it as a fringe movement that attracted extreme followers of humanistic psychology, while scholars such as Eugene Taylor have acknowledged the field's interdisciplinary approach, at the same time noting its epistemological and practical challenges. The field's connections to psychedelic substances, religious ideas, and the new age movement have also further fueled controversy.

Transpersonal psychology has influenced various related and transpersonal disciplines, including transpersonal anthropology, business studies, near-death studies, and parapsychology. The field has a strong institutional presence in California, where the Association for Transpersonal Psychology, Institute of Transpersonal Psychology, and Journal of Transpersonal Psychology were developed.

== History ==
=== Origins ===
Early use of the term "transpersonal" can also be credited to Stanislav Grof and Anthony Sutich, who were dissatisfied with the humanistic psychology movement and included spirituality in their new framework. In 1967 to 1968, Abraham Maslow was in close dialogue with both Grof and Sutich regarding the name and orientation of the new field, later describing transpersonal psychology as a "fourth force" in psychology.

According to Powers, the term "transpersonal" starts to show up in academic journals from 1970 onwards. Humanistic and transpersonal psychology are often associated with the Human Potential Movement, a movement in the 1960s that explored various therapies and philosophies at institutions like Esalen in Big Sur, California. Transpersonal psychology was heavily influenced by Western culture, and had not been regarded as a “hard science”.

=== Formative period ===
Gradually, during the 1960s, the term "transpersonal" became associated with a distinct school of psychology within the humanistic psychology movement. This branch of psychology was introduced to a time when the majority of schools were teaching Freudian Psychology.

In 1969, Maslow, Grof and Sutich were among the initiators behind the publication of the first issue of the Journal of Transpersonal Psychology. The Association for Transpersonal Psychology was established in 1972, the International Transpersonal Psychology Association in 1973, and the Institute of Transpersonal Psychology in 1975 . The institute was founded by Robert Frager and James Fadiman in response to an academic climate that they felt was hostile to such ideas.

Soon, other institutions began offering curricula in transpersonal psychology including Saybrook Graduate School, the California Institute of Asian Studies (now California Institute of Integral Studies), JFK University, and Naropa. Other proponents of transpersonal psychology included Ram Dass; Elmer and Alyce Green who were affiliated with the Menninger Foundation; and Ken Wilber.

Transpersonal psychology has been influenced by various Eastern spiritual traditions, such as Buddhism and Hinduism, which emphasize practices like meditation, mindfulness, and the dissolution of the ego. In 1969, Anthony Sutich, along with Maslow and other humanistic psychologists, founded the Journal of Transpersonal Psychology, formally establishing the field. The creation of the Association for Transpersonal Psychology in 1972 further solidified its identity. Transpersonal psychology focuses on exploring spiritual experiences, mystical states, self-transcendence, and the holistic development of human potential.

An interest group was later re-formed as the Transpersonal Psychology Interest Group (TPIG), which continued to promote transpersonal issues in collaboration with Division 32. Ken Wilber and Michael Washburn delivered the main transpersonal models of development of this period, Wilber in 1977 and Washburn in 1988. Ken Wilber has since distanced himself from the label "transpersonal", being in favour of the label of "integral" since the mid-1990s. In 1998 he formed the Integral Institute.

In 1998, the San Francisco Chronicle reported on the holistic studies program at the John F. Kennedy University in Orinda, which included a transpersonal psychology department. The program was considered to be unique at the time, but also controversial. Commentators presented their skepticism towards the program.

=== Later developments ===
Proponents of transpersonal psychology were behind the proposal for a new diagnostic category to be included in the DSM-manual of the American Psychiatric Association called "Psychoreligious or psychospiritual problem", which was approved by the Task Force on DSM-IV in 1993, after changing its name to Religious or spiritual problem. Concurrently, there was an increase in membership for the Association for Transpersonal Psychology, stabilizing at approximately 3000 members in the early nineties. In 1996, the British Psychological Society established a Transpersonal Psychology Section.

In 2007 the Journal of Transpersonal Psychology and the International Journal of Transpersonal Studies were accepted for indexing in PsycINFO, the journal database of the American Psychological Association. That same year, Ruzek, noted that the "American Psychological Association (APA) and most academic institutions have not yet recognized transpersonal psychology as an approved area of study; transpersonal psychology is rarely mentioned in mainstream academic journals or textbooks; and relatively few American academicians identify themselves as practitioners of transpersonal psychology. Furthermore, transpersonal psychology is scarcely mentioned, if at all, in history or introductory psychology texts".

== Reception, recognition and criticism ==
Although transpersonal psychology has received some support from both psychologists and non-psychologists, it remains highly controversial and has not been widely accepted by mainstream academic psychology.

Transpersonal psychology has been criticized for lacking conceptual, evidentiary, and scientific rigor. In a review of criticisms of the field, Paul F Cunningham writes, "philosophers have criticized transpersonal psychology because its metaphysics is naive and epistemology is undeveloped. Multiplicity of definitions and lack of operationalization of many of its concepts has led to a conceptual confusion about the nature of transpersonal psychology itself... Biologists have criticized transpersonal psychology for its lack of attention to biological foundations of behavior and experience. Physicists have criticized transpersonal psychology for inappropriately accommodating physic concepts as explanations of consciousness."

Albert Ellis, a cognitive and humanistic psychologist, has questioned the results of transpersonal psychotherapy. In 1989, he worked with Raymond Yeager for the release of Why some therapies don't work: The dangers of transpersonal psychology, where the authors compared the results of transpersonal psychology with the effects of rational-emotive therapy and noted the dangers of the transpersonal approach. Ellis has also questioned the scientific status of transpersonal psychology, and its relationship to religion, mysticism and authoritarian belief systems.

Ernest Hilgard, a psychologist at Stanford University, regarded transpersonal psychology as a fringe movement that attracted the more extreme followers of humanistic psychology.

Eugene Taylor, a humanistic psychologist affiliated with Harvard University, viewed transpersonal psychology as "philosophically naive, poorly financed, at times almost anti-intellectual, and frequently overrated as far as its influences", while at the same time noting the field's "integrated approach to understanding the phenomenology of scientific method", "centrality of qualitative research", and its emphasised "importance of interdisciplinary communication". In a later article, Taylor regarded transpersonal psychology as a visionary American folk-psychology with little historical relation to American academic psychology, except through its association with humanistic psychology and the categories of transcendence and consciousness.

Another contentious aspect concerns the topic of psychedelic substances. Commenting upon the controversial status of psychedelic and entheogenic substances in contemporary culture, Elmer, MacDonald & Friedman observe that these drugs have been used for therapeutic effect in the transpersonal movement, but that it is uncommon in contemporary therapy. Bravo and Grob note that "the place of psychedelics in spiritual practice remains controversial".

Nicole Amity Ruzek, who interviewed founders of transpersonal psychology, as well as historians of American psychology, found that the field of transpersonal psychology had made little impact on the larger field of psychology in America. Among the factors that contributed to this situation was mainstream psychology's "resistance to spiritual and philosophical ideas", and the tendency of transpersonal psychologists to isolate themselves from the larger field.

One of the earliest criticisms of transpersonal psychology was leveled by the humanistic psychologist Rollo May, who "disputed the conceptual foundations of transpersonal psychology". May also criticized the field for neglecting the personal dimension of the psyche by elevating the pursuit of the transcendental, and for neglecting the "dark side of human nature".

== Branches and related fields ==
Other transpersonal disciplines, such as transpersonal anthropology and transpersonal business studies, are known as transpersonal disciplines. Other fields of study that are related to transpersonal psychology, include near-death studies and parapsychology.

A few commentators have suggested that there is a difference between transpersonal psychology and a broader category of transpersonal theories, sometimes called transpersonal studies. According to Friedman this category might include several approaches to the transpersonal that lie outside mainstream science. However, according to Ferrer the field of transpersonal psychology is "situated within the wider umbrella of transpersonal studies".

Transpersonal psychology has also been associated with New Age beliefs and pop psychology. However, leading authors in the field, among those Sovatsky, Rowan, and Hartelius have criticized the nature of "New Age"-philosophy and discourse. Rowan even states that "The Transpersonal is not the New Age". Other commentators, such as Wade, note that the field remains part of the New Age, despite the fact that transpersonal psychologists may want no such association.

Although some consider that the distinction between transpersonal psychology and the psychology of religion is fading (e.g. The Oxford Handbook of Psychology and Spirituality), there is still generally considered to be a clear distinction between the two. Much of the focus of psychology of religion is concerned with issues that would not be considered 'transcendent' within transpersonal psychology, so the two disciplines have quite distinct focuses. Transpersonal psychology is more so spiritually focused, as it lacks a hierarchy and seeks an altruistic approach.

== Organizations, publications and locations ==
Although the perspective of transpersonal psychology has spread to a number of interest groups across the US and Europe, its origins were in California, and the field has always been strongly associated with institutions on the west coast of the US. Both the Association for Transpersonal Psychology and the forerunner to Sofia University were founded in the state of California, and a number of the fields leading theorists come from this area of the US. A European counterpart to the American institution, the European Transpersonal Psychology Association (ETPA), was founded much later.

Leading publications include the Journal of Transpersonal Psychology and the International Journal of Transpersonal Studies. Smaller publications include the Transpersonal Psychology Review, the journal of the Transpersonal Psychology Section of the British Psychological Society.

== See also ==
- Claudio Naranjo
- Indian psychology
- Near-death studies
- Neurotheology
- Transpersonal anthropology
- Western esotericism and psychology
