= Reclaiming Their Voice: The Native American Vote in New Mexico & Beyond =

- Directed by: Dorothy Fadiman
- Narrated by: Peter Coyote
- Release date: 2009
- Running time: 42 minutes
- Country: United States
- Language: English

Reclaiming Their Voice: The Native American Vote in New Mexico is a 2009 documentary film directed by filmmaker, Dorothy Fadiman, which documents ways in which Native Americans have been disenfranchised over centuries, in particular in voting representation. It chronicles the Laguna Pueblo tribe of New Mexico in their 2004 groundbreaking voter registration drive and the challenges they faced once Laguna voters arrived at the polls. The film also shows the Sacred Alliance for Grassroots Equality's (SAGE) fight to preserve parts of the sacred Petroglyph National Monument.

The film is narrated by Peter Coyote and features interviews with members of the local Laguna community, including New Mexico House Representative, W. Ken Martinez.

Robin H. Levin, the Community Librarian of the Fort Washakie School in Wyoming, said of the film: "Emotions run deep when viewing this insightful political documentary. The story blends sincere efforts to achieve political clout with unfortunate results that, somehow, do not shut down the hopes of Native voters in New Mexico."

In 2010, the film won the “Best New Mexico Film Award” at the very first Duke City Doc Festival which later became the Albuquerque International Film Festival.

== Screenings and festivals ==
- 2009 United Nations International Film Festival, Stanford University
- 2009 Peninsula Peace and Justice Center July Screening
- 2010 American Indian Movement International Film Festival
- 2010 Bechtel International House Screening April 2010, Stanford University
- 2010 Las Vegas Film Commission with the Las Vegas Peace and Justice Center
- 2010 Duke City Doc Fest/Albuquerque International Film Festival
