= The Fragile Promise of Choice: Abortion in the United States Today =

- Directed by: Dorothy Fadiman
- Produced by: Danny McGuire, Beth Selzer
- Music by: Erika Luckett
- Release date: 1996
- Running time: 57 minutes
- Country: United States
- Language: English

The Fragile Promise of Choice: Abortion in the United States Today is a documentary film by Dorothy Fadiman which examines abortion rights and access in the U.S. in 1996 which was 23 years after the U.S. Supreme Court ruling in Roe v. Wade. Fadiman narrated the film which featured interviews with abortion care providers and news clips, including one of Dr. George Tiller. It is the last of three films called the Trilogy on Reproductive Rights or the From the Back-Alleys to the Supreme Court & Beyond Trilogy.
