= International Transpersonal Association =

Research organization

The International Transpersonal Association (ITA) is membership organization in the field of Transpersonal studies.

== History ==
The organization was founded in 1978 by Stanislav Grof, Michael Murphy and Richard Price In 1980 the association was incorporated, in California, as an organization promoting transpersonal education and scientific research. By 1985 the association was based in San Diego and had, by then, hosted a number of international transpersonal conferences.

In 2004 the organization was dissolved, but later re-incorporated. The new ITA was incorporated in May 2008.

Representatives of the organization was among the contributors to the Wiley Blackwell Handbook of Transpersonal Psychology (2nd Edition.)

== Publications ==
The association publishes the International Journal of Transpersonal Studies. The journal is sponsored by the California Institute of Integral Studies.

== See also ==
- Transpersonal
