= Scott Apel =

American writer

D. Scott Apel is an American writer. He is perhaps best known for his tribute volume Philip K. Dick: The Dream Connection and other analysis of science fiction author Philip K. Dick. Apel is also known for his work on PBS analyzing the 1968 television series The Prisoner.

Apel hosted a rebroadcast of The Prisoner on San Jose public television station KTEH in the mid-1980s. He likens the series' structure to that of a three-act play. Apel's commentary on the themes of The Prisoner notes the show's possible interpretations from Jungian psychology, Platonic philosophy, and Joseph Campbell's "journey of the hero".

Apel was friends with science fiction author Philip K. Dick. He was editor of The Dream Connection, a book which contained transcripts of an interview Apel held with Dick, as well as a letter written from Dick to Apel. Apel was also interviewed for the documentary film The Gospel According to Philip K. Dick.

Apel has published some works of fiction, and was formerly a movie columnist for the San Jose Mercury News.

== Partial bibliography ==
- Philip K. Dick: The Dream Connection, edited by D. Scott Apel. 2000
- Killer B's: The 237 Best Movies On Video You've (Probably) Never Seen (The Impermanent Press, 1997).
- Silicon Valley Night Beat December 1990, R & E Publishers
- The Films of Philip K. Dick by D. Scott Apel https://web.archive.org/web/20080513113554/http://www.deepleafproductions.com/wilsonlibrary/texts/apel-dick.html
- The Complete works of D. Scott Apel Copyright 1982
- Daughter of the Wind Copyright 1981
- Approaching Science Fiction Writers by D. Scott Apel and Kevin C. Briggs. Copyright 1980
- E Attraction by D. Scott Apel. Illustrations by Yasha Haas. 1977 The Permanent Press.
