= When Abortion Was Illegal: Untold Stories =

1992 film

When Abortion Is Illegal: Untold Stories
- Film poster
- Directed by: Dorothy Fadiman
- Produced by: Danny McGuire, Beth Selzer, Daniel Myers, KTEH, and Dorothy Fadiman
- Narrated by: Dorothy Fadiman
- Music by: Erika Luckett
- Production company: Concentric Media
- Distributed by: Bullfrog Films
- Release date: 1992
- Running time: 28 minutes
- Country: United States
- Language: English

When Abortion Was Illegal: Untold Stories is a 1992 American short documentary film directed by Dorothy Fadiman. It was nominated for an Academy Award for Best Documentary Short. The film consists of first person stories which reveal the physical, emotional and legal consequences of having or providing an abortion when it was a criminal act. The film is the first of three films called the Reproductive Rights Trilogy or "From the Back Alleys to the Supreme Court & Beyond."
