= Warwick Fox =

Australian philosopher

Warwick Fox (born 1 March 1954) is an Australian-UK philosopher. He is Emeritus Professor of Philosophy, University of Lancashire, and his books include Toward a Transpersonal Ecology: Developing New Foundations for Environmentalism; Ethics and the Built Environment (ed.); A Theory of General Ethics: Human Relationships, Nature, and the Built Environment; On Beautiful Days Such as This: A Philosopher's Search for Love, Work, Place, Meaning, and Suchlike; and The Essence of Good Design: Responsive Cohesion (with Antony Radford and Isis Brook). His main areas of philosophical interest are environmental philosophy, General Ethics (a term coined and defined by Fox), developing his theory of responsive cohesion, and the nature of the interior lives of humans and other animals.

== Philosophical work ==
=== Deep Ecology ===
Fox's earlier work (1984 to mid-1990s) focused on analysing and developing the deep ecology approach to environmental philosophy. His central publication in this area was Toward a Transpersonal Ecology: Developing New Foundations for Environmentalism in which he argued that deep ecology is associated with three basic ideas: (i) the general idea of developing a non-anthropocentric or, more positively, an ecocentric approach to the world around us (summarized in one form by a widely referred to eight-point "Deep Ecology Platform"; (ii) the idea of "asking deeper questions" about our relationship with the nonhuman world (which it was claimed, primarily by Arne Naess, would inevitably lead us to first principles or "fundamentals" from which a broadly ecocentric perspective would follow); and (iii) the idea of "cultivating wider and deeper identification" with the world around us.

Fox argued that the first idea, of advancing a less anthropocentric/more ecocentric approach to the world around us, was eminently defensible but hardly distinctive of the deep ecology approach since other environmental philosophical approaches (e.g., Leopold's influential "Land Ethic" and other forms of ecophere or Gaia-oriented ethics) along with some broader socio-political movements (e.g., some wings of the wider Green movement as well as more radical wings of Green political parties) were also trying to do this. Conversely, he argued that the second idea, of "asking deeper questions" about our relationship with the world around us, was relatively distinctive of the deep ecological approach but wasn't defensible as a way of ensuring less anthropocentric/more ecocentric approaches to the world around us. Fox demonstrated this by showing that the process of asking deeper questions could easily lead one to endorse first principles (or "fundamentals") from which one could straightforwardly derive even outrageously anthropocentric conclusions, depending upon the other hypotheses that one made use of in employing Naess's approach to developing a normative system. Finally, Fox argued that the third idea, of "cultivating wider and deeper identification" with the world around us, was both defensible and distinctive of the deep ecology approach to environmental philosophy. Fox referred to this defensible and distinctive aspect of deep ecology as "transpersonal ecology", since it sought to encourage us to identify with the wider world in a way that went well beyond our normal range of personally-based identifications.

Pursuing this line of thinking, Fox distinguished between three basic forms of identification, which he referred to as "personally-based identification", "ontologically based-identification", and "cosmologically-based identification". These forms of identification refer, respectively, to forms of felt commonality with other entities that are brought about through personal involvement with them; through a deep-seated realization of the "utterly astonishing fact" that, like oneself, they too exist (which takes us into the realm of what Wittgenstein himself referred to as the "mystical"); and through a deep-seated realization of the fact that we and all other entities are aspects of a single unfolding reality. Fox argued particularly for the importance of this last, cosmologically-based, form of identification in counteracting our tendency to rely too much in our lives on personally-based forms of identification.

=== Ethics and the Built Environment ===
In the late 1990s Fox moved on from writing on deep ecology (including its connections to and differences from other approaches to environmental ethics), and began to consider the field of environmental ethics as a whole. In his edited book Ethics and the Built Environment, he argued that, whereas the world around us – our "environment" – consists of both natural, spontaneously-occurring environments and human-constructed – or built – environments (and, increasingly, their various admixtures), environmental ethics as it had developed to that point had essentially been concerned only with the ethics of the natural environment. In his view, this meant that just as traditional, human-centred forms of ethics had exhibited what he referred to as a "blind spot" in regard to affording any significant consideration (or any consideration at all) to the nonhuman world, so the development of environmental ethics to that point had exhibited a major blind spot of its own in regard to the human-constructed (or built) environment. What we needed, Fox argued, was a more general kind of ethics that could embrace not only traditional, human-focused ethical concerns but also ethical concerns raised by our relationships with both the nonhuman natural environment and the human-constructed, or built, environment.

=== General Ethics and the Theory of Responsive Cohesion ===
In A Theory of General Ethics Fox refers to the kind of ethics he believes we need to develop as "General Ethics" (always spelt with a capital "G" and a capital "E" to "distinguish it from coincidental or haphazard references to 'general ethics' or 'ethics in general,' by which an author may well mean something much more limited"). He defines General Ethics as referring to the development of a single, integrated approach to ethics that encompasses the realms of interhuman ethics, the ethics of the nonhuman natural environment, and the ethics of the human-constructed (or built) environment.

David Keller showed "General Ethics" as the most inclusive sphere in his diagram of "Spheres of Moral Responsibility" in his Environmental Ethics teaching anthology for the Wiley-Blackwell Philosophy: The Big Questions series. Keller also included the category of "General Ethics" as the third and final section (after the sections on "Individualism" and "Holism (Ecocentrism)") of the "What is the Scope of Moral Responsibility" section in that collection.

Fox refers to his own approach to General Ethics as "the theory of responsive cohesion". (He accepts that other approaches might also be developed to General Ethics and offers suggestions as to the general structural features that they, too, would likely need to possess.) Fox's theory of responsive cohesion approach proceeds from the idea that the ultimate basis of value is to be found not at the relatively high level of certain kinds of value-conferring powers or capacities that certain entities possess (such as rationality, sentience, or even being alive), which is where most ethicists have tended to look for it, but rather at the far more basic level of structure, form, or organization.

Specifically, Fox argues that the most valuable kinds of things typically exemplify the relational quality of responsive cohesion, that is, they hold together (or cohere) by virtue of the mutual responsiveness of the elements or salient features that constitute them. Fox makes it clear that he construes "responsiveness" very generally here to include both literal and metaphorical senses of the term, so that this idea applies as much to art and architecture as it does to living and social systems. Fox contrasts responsive cohesion with two other basic forms organization, which he refers to as fixed cohesion, in which "things" – from thoughts to bodies to buildings – hold together, but do so in regimented, template-driven, forced, or otherwise non-mutually responsive ways, and discohesion, in which things fail to hold together well or at all.

Fox develops the idea that responsive cohesion represents the foundational value (i.e., the most basic general value we can find) into a General Ethics (i.e., a comprehensive ethical system as defined above). This system rests, in particular, on the exploration and development of the idea of responsive cohesion in two dimensions: the contextual and the experiential.

The contextual implications of the idea of responsive cohesion are important because some responsively cohesive arrangements can represent the contexts of other responsively cohesive arrangements, but this doesn't necessarily mean that there will be a harmonious – or responsively cohesive – relationship between them. In these cases, what should be given higher priority, the context or the item of interest within it? To answer this, Fox develops the theory of responsive cohesion's normative theory of contexts, which comprises an argument for respecting more inclusive responsively cohesive contexts over less inclusive responsively cohesive contexts or items. The upshot is that we should be guided by the positive ideal of preserving, regenerating, and creating examples of responsive cohesion that do not themselves cause the destruction or diminishment of contextual responsive cohesion. At the most general level, this means that human social systems should accommodate far more to the wider, biospherical (ecological) system rather than vice versa, and that human-constructed things, such as buildings, should in turn be made to accommodate far more to biospherical systems and human social systems (in that ultimate order of priority) than vice versa.

The experiential implications of the idea of responsive cohesion are important because, whereas some responsively cohesive arrangements are merely "things" (i.e., there is no inner, experiential dimension to them; it would not be, as Thomas Nagel has taught us to say, "like anything" to be these things), other responsively cohesive arrangements constitute sentient beings and even "selves" (i.e., in either case, it would be "like something" to be them). Fox argues that sentient beings, pure and simple (i.e., sentient beings that do not also constitute "selves"), can only be harmed in terms of being caused unnecessary pain and suffering, whereas "selves" – beings that have a sense of self through time, an "autobiographical self" – can be harmed, in addition, by the unwanted death or diminishment of their autobiographical capacities. In common with many other ethicists, Fox argues that we should actively seek to avoid causing either of these forms of harm.

Having developed these dimensions of the basic concept of responsive cohesion into the fully-fledged version of the theory of responsive cohesion, Fox concludes A Theory of General Ethics by applying the resources of the theory to what he identifies as the 18 central problems in the realms of interhuman ethics, the ethics of the natural environment, and the ethics of the human-constructed (or built) environment.

Fox's theory of responsive cohesion has been applied by other researchers to a range of areas including agriculture, architecture, craft, environmental aesthetics, gardening, landscape architecture, landscape management, politics, and urban design. Fox has himself applied this theory to these and, by implication, all areas of design in a paper specifically devoted to the question of good design. Fox together with his colleagues Antony Radford and Isis Brook has advanced these ideas in their book The Essence of Good Design: Responsive Cohesion.

Fox provides an overview of the development of his work from deep ecology to the theory of responsive cohesion, as well as broader reflections on "The Ideas Game" in general, in two of the later chapters of his semi-autobiographical/semi-fictional book On Beautiful Days Such as This.

== See also ==
- Deep ecology
- Growth Fetish
- List of environmental philosophers
- Arne Næss
