= The Architect's Dream =

1840 painting by Thomas Cole

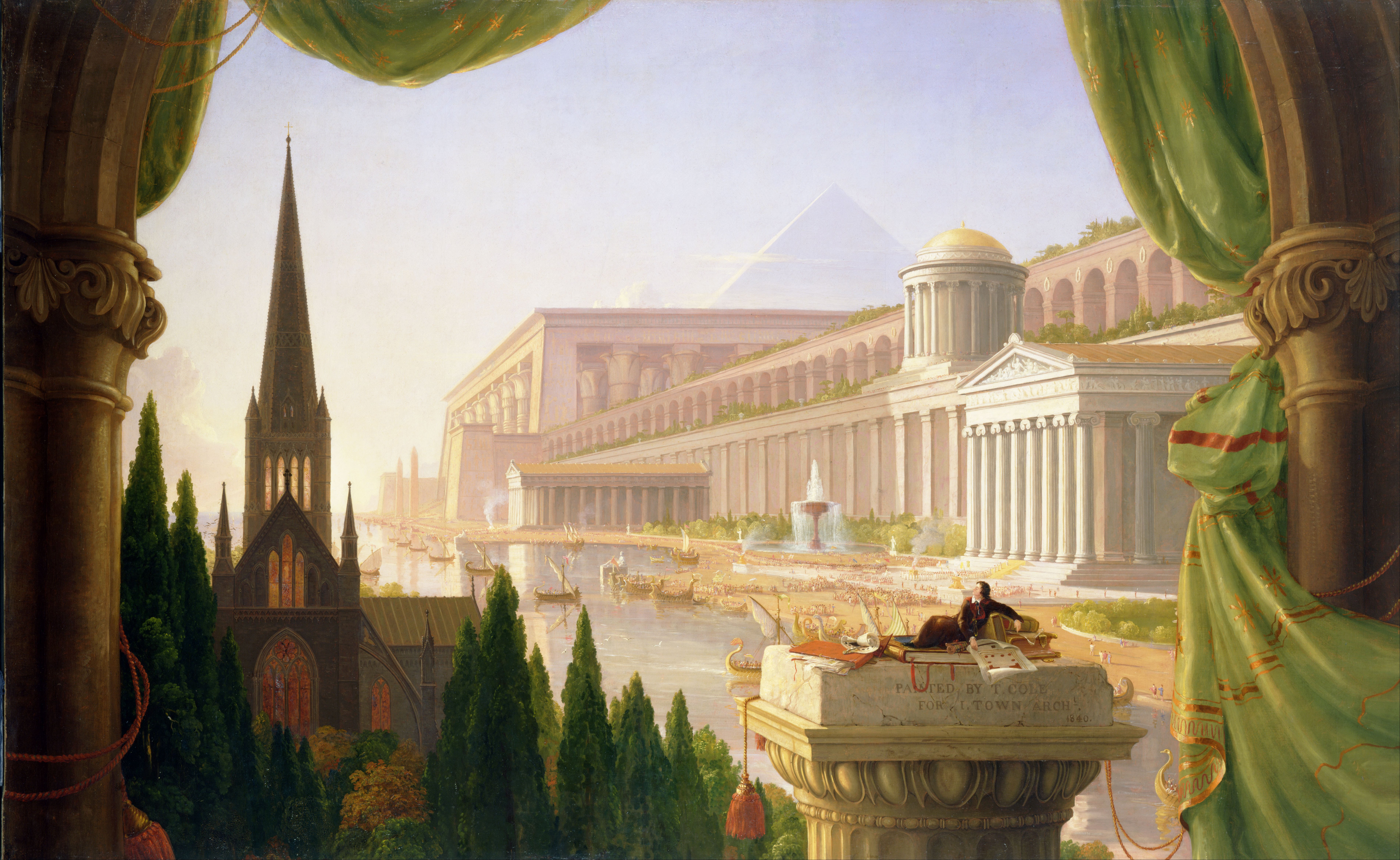
- Artist: Thomas Cole
- Year: 1840
- Medium: Oil on canvas
- Dimensions: 136 cm × 214 cm (54 in × 84 in)
- Location: Toledo Museum of Art, Toledo

The Architect's Dream is an 1840 oil painting created by Thomas Cole for New York architect Ithiel Town. Cole incorporated pieces of architecture from Egyptian, Greek, Roman, and Gothic styles in various different parts of the painting, having dabbled in architecture previously. Cole finished the painting in only five weeks and showed it in the National Academy of Design annual exhibition that year. However, Town was not pleased by the "almost exclusively architectural subject" of the painting and refused to accept it. After a lengthy exchange of letters, Cole agreed to paint a more conventional landscape for Town and to take back The Architect's Dream, which remained in his possession until his death.

The Toledo Museum of Art acquired the painting in 1949.

== Composition ==
In this layout, the oldest buildings (Egyptian) are in the back, Greek buildings in the middle, and Roman constructions at the foreground, where Cole lies on top of the large column.

== Artist's analysis ==
In a letter written in the late 1830s, Cole stated that:

For architecture to arrive at the perfection which we see in the best examples of Greece, Ages of expression and thought must have been necessary [for] the human mind [to] have traveled by slow degrees from the rude column of unknown stone such as formed the druidical structures through the stupendous portals of Egyptian Art to unsurpassed beauty of the Grecian Temple...Roman architecture is but depraved Greek. The forms are borrowed but the spirit was lost & it became more and more rude until it sank to the uncouth incongruities of what are called the dark ages... [Gothic] Architecture aspires to something beyond finite perfection[.] It leaves the philosophic completion of Grecian Art when all is finished to the eye and touch and appeals to the imagination. Partaking of the Genius of Christianity it opens a world beyond the visible in which we dwell...All is lofty, aspiring and mysterious. Its towers and pinnacles climb toward the clouds like airy fabricks. Ever hovering on the verge of the impossible, on it the mind does not dwell with satisfied delight, but takes wing & soars into an imaginary world. The longings, the imaginings, the lofty aspirations of Christianity have found expression in stone.

== Provenance and derivative works ==
The painting was acquired by the Toledo Museum of Art in 1949.

It features on the cover of the 1991 book The Passion of the Western Mind by Richard Tarnas, and was the inspiration for Kate Bush's song "An Architect's Dream" on the 2005 album Aerial.

== See also ==
- List of paintings by Thomas Cole
