= Eugene Taylor (psychologist) =

Eugene Irvine Taylor
- Born: 28 October 1946; Philadelphia, PA
- Died: 30 January 2013 (aged 66); Cambridge, Massachusetts
- Education: Southern Methodist University, Boston University
- Scientific career
- Fields: History & Philosophy of Psychology & Religion
- Workplaces: Cambridge Institute of Psychology and Religion, Saybrook University, Massachusetts General Hospital, Harvard University
- Academic advisors: Henry Murray

Eugene Taylor (28 October 1946 – 30 January 2013) was a scholar on William James and a professor of psychology at Saybrook University and Harvard University.

== Biography ==
Taylor was educated at Southern Methodist University and Harvard Divinity School, and Boston University (PhD in the History and Philosophy of Psychology). He was the 1983 William James Lecturer at Harvard Divinity School. Taylor died in 2013 and was the subject of many remembrances and obituaries. Taylor held the rank of yondan (4th degree black belt) and was the founder the Harvard Aikido Club in 1981 and a shidoin (instructor) in the United States Aikido Federation. In 1993 he founded the Cambridge Institute of Psychology and Comparative Religions; was a founding member of The New Existentialists; and was the Vice President of the Massachusetts Association of Swedenborgian Churches (see Church of the New Jerusalem (Cambridge, Massachusetts)). Dr. Taylor was Senior Psychologist in the Department of Psychiatry at Massachusetts General Hospital (appointed official historian) and Lecturer in Psychiatry, Harvard Medical School.

Taylor was known for the size and scope of his personal library of an estimated 8000 volumes.

== Publications ==
Books authored or edited by Taylor include

- Taylor, Eugene (1983). William James on exceptional mental states. New York: Scribner. ISBN 0684179385. OCLC 9532853.
- Taylor, Eugene (1999). Shadow culture : psychology and spirituality in America. Washington, D.C.: Counterpoint. ISBN 1887178805. OCLC 40762674.
- Taylor, Eugene (2009). The mystery of personality : a history of psychodynamic theories. New York: Springer. ISBN 9780387981031. OCLC 310401002.
