= Robert Frager =

American social psychologist

- Born: June 20, 1940 (age 86)
- Education: Harvard University; Reed College
- Occupations: Psychologist, University Professor

Robert Frager is an American social psychologist responsible for establishing America's first educational institution dedicated to transpersonal psychology. Frager is known for founding the Institute of Transpersonal Psychology, now called Sofia University, in Palo Alto, California, where he currently holds the position of director of the low residency Master of Arts in Spiritual Guidance program and professor of psychology. Frager has previously acted as president of the Association for Transpersonal Psychology as well as a consultant, educator and a spiritual teacher in the Sufi tradition.

== Early life and education ==
Frager was born June 20, 1940 in California to a Jewish family. He attended Reed College in Portland, Oregon from 1957 to 1961, graduating with a B.A. in psychology. He earned a PhD in social psychology from Harvard University in Cambridge, Massachusetts, which he attended from 1961 to 1967. From 1963 to 1965, he was a fellow at the East-West Center in Honolulu, Hawaii. From 1967 to 1968, he was a research fellow at Keio University in Tokyo, Japan.

== Career ==
Frager studies transpersonal psychology and he established the country's first educational institution dedicated to it. He also teaches courses in spiritual psychology and "The Wisdom of Islam" at the online University of Philosophical Research and also in the online MA program of the Holmes Institute Graduate School of Consciousness Studies.

== Selected bibliography ==
- Motivation and Personality (1986, supervising editor)
- Love Is the Wine: Talks of a Sufi Master in America (1987, editor)
- Personality and Personal Growth (1993 onwards)
- Who Am I?: Personality Types for Self-Discovery (1994)
- Essential Sufism, an anthology of Sufi teaching materials (1997)
- Heart, Self and Soul: The Sufi Psychology of Growth, Balance, and Harmony (1999)
- The Wisdom of Islam: A Practical Guide to the Wisdom of Islamic Belief (2002)
- Sharing Sacred Stories: Current Approaches to Spiritual Direction and Guidance (2007, editor)
- Sufi Talks: Teachings of an American Sufi Sheihk (2012)

== Personal life ==
Frager embraced Islam in 1981. He is also a Sufi teacher, or sheikh, in the Halveti-Jerrahi order, in which he was initiated by Muzaffer Ozak and goes by the name of Sheikh Ragip al-Jerrahi, leading a dergah (Sufi community) in Redwood City, California. Frager also practices the Japanese martial art Aikido, in which, at the rank of 8th dan with the International Aikido Federation, he is one of the highest-ranking non-Japanese in the world.
