= Coleman Barks =

American poet (1937–2026)

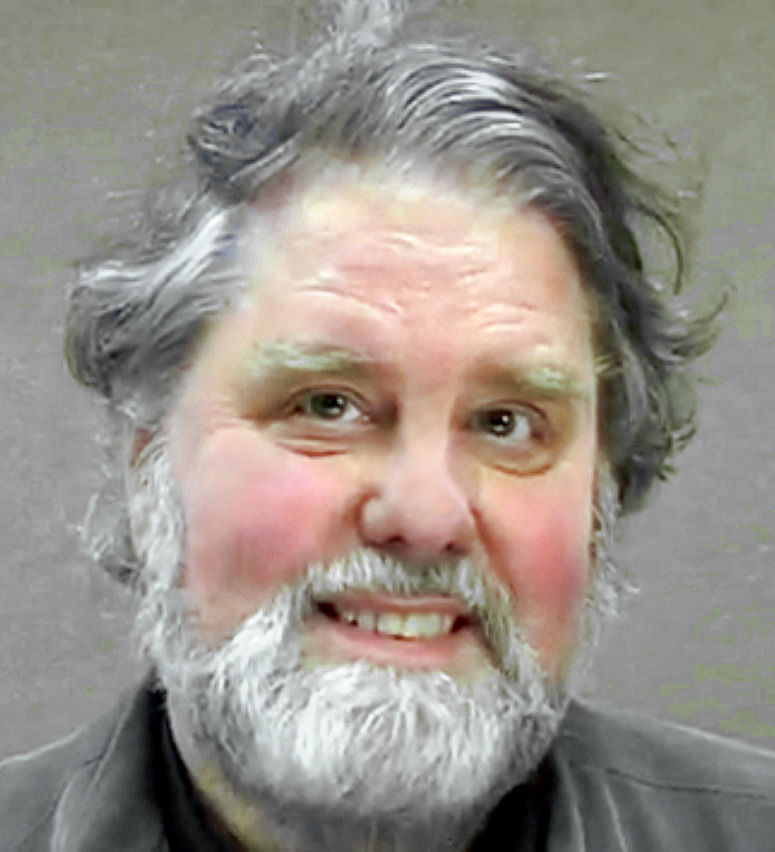
- Barks in 2004
- Born: Coleman Bryan Barks; April 23, 1937; Chattanooga, Tennessee, U.S.
- Died: February 23, 2026 (aged 88); Athens, Georgia, U.S.
- Occupation: Poet
- Spouse(s): Kittsu Greenwood (1962–?, divorced)
- Children: Benjamin, Cole
- Relatives: Elizabeth Barks Cox (sister)
- Writing career
- Genre: American poetry
- Notable works: Gourd Seed, The Essential Rumi
- Website: www.colemanbarks.com

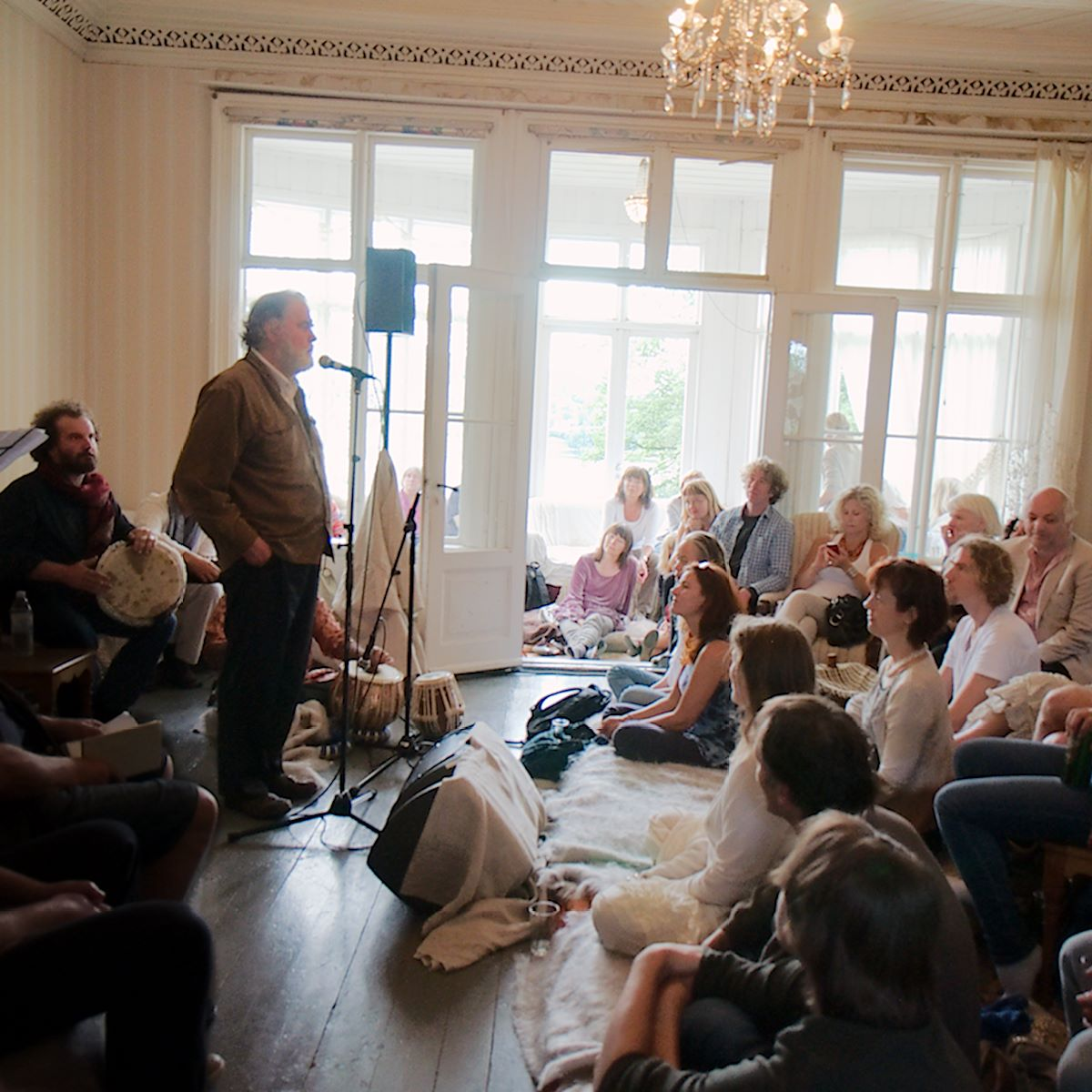
Barks reading at the Festival of Silence, Esvika, Asker, Norway, June 25, 2011

Coleman Bryan Barks (April 23, 1937 – February 23, 2026) was an American poet and literature faculty member at the University of Georgia. Although he neither spoke nor read Persian, he was a popular interpreter of Rumi, rewriting the poems based on other English translations.

== Early life and education ==
Barks was a native of Chattanooga, Tennessee. He attended the Baylor School, where his father was headmaster and where he grew up on the campus. He received a bachelor's degree in English from the University of North Carolina at Chapel Hill in 1959, and a master's in English from the University of California, Berkeley in 1961.

He was a student of the Sufi Shaykh Bawa Muhaiyaddeen.

== Career ==
Barks taught literature at the University of Georgia for three decades.

He made frequent international appearances and was well known throughout the Middle East. Barks's work has contributed to an extremely strong following of Rumi in the English-speaking world. Due to his work, the ideas of Sufism have crossed many cultural boundaries over the past few decades. Barks received an honorary doctorate from University of Tehran in 2006.

Barks also read his original poetry at the Geraldine R. Dodge Poetry Festival. In March 2009, Barks was inducted into the Georgia Writers Hall of Fame.

=== Rumi interpretations ===
Barks published several volumes of his interpretations of Rumi's poetry since 1976, including The Hand of Poetry, Five Mystic Poets of Persia in 1993, The Essential Rumi in 1995, The Book of Love in 2003 and A Year with Rumi in 2006.

=== Controversies ===
Barks has been criticized for removing references to Islam from the poetry of Rumi.

=== Original poetry ===
Barks published several volumes of his own poetry, beginning with The Juice in 1972 and including Gourd Seed (1993); Tentmaking (2001); and, also in 2001, Club: Granddaughter Poems (OCLC 53128423), a collection of poems written with and about his granddaughter, Briny Barks. His poems have appeared in anthologies including Quickly Aging Here and New Voices in American Poetry.

== Death ==
Barks died at his home in Athens, Georgia, on February 23, 2026, at the age of 88.

== Discography ==
- Barks, Coleman; Robert Bly (1989). Poems of Rumi (Cassette). Audio Literature. ISBN 0-944993-10-9.
- Barks, Coleman; Hamza El Din; Steve Coughlin (1991). Like This: More Poems of Rumi (Audiobook). Audio Literature. ISBN 0-944993-14-1.
- Barks, Coleman; Dorothy Fadiman (1993). Selections From Open Secret (Poems of the 13th Century Sufi Master Rumi) (Cassette). Coleman and Dorothy.
- Barks, Coleman (1997). Dust Particles in Sunlight: Poems of Rumi (Cassette). Omega Publications. ISBN 0-930872-60-6.
- Barks, Coleman. (1997). The Hand of Poetry (Cassette). Omega Publications. ISBN 0-930872-57-6.
- Barks, Coleman. Mary Sinclair, Lory Messina (1997). The Woman Who Dressed As a Man: Poems of Attar (Cassette). Omega Publications. ISBN 0-930872-59-2.
- Barks, Coleman (2001). I want Burning (CD) (Unabridged ed.). Sounds True Incorporated. ISBN 1-56455-830-4.
- Barks, Coleman; Marcus Wise; David Whetstone; Robert Bly (2001). Rumi: Voice of Longing (CD) (Unabridged ed.). Sounds True Incorporated. ISBN 1-56455-832-0.
- Barks, Coleman (2005). Rumi (CD). Canadian Broadcasting Corporation. ISBN 0-660-19370-1.

=== Other credits ===
| Year | Song | Artist | Album | Role |
|---|---|---|---|---|
| 2015 | "Kaleidoscope" | Coldplay | A Head Full of Dreams | Vocals (Interpretation of Rumi's "The Guest House" |
| 2022 | "Across the Oceans" | Mamak Khadem | Remembrance | Vocals (Rumi interpretation) |

== See also ==
- Persian poetry
