= Dorothy Fadiman =

American film director and producer (born 1939)

- Born: June 3, 1939 (age 87); Pennsylvania
- Citizenship: USA
- Occupations: Filmmaker, director, producer
- Spouse: James Fadiman
- Children: 2

Dorothy Fadiman (born June 3, 1939, in Pennsylvania) is an American documentary filmmaker, director, and producer.

== Early life ==
Fadiman was raised in Pennsylvania.

== Education ==
Fadiman attended University of Pittsburgh and Penn State, and received an MA from Stanford University.

== Career ==
Since 1976, Fadiman has been producing documentaries with a focus on social justice and human rights.

Fadiman had an illegal abortion in 1962 after becoming pregnant while at Stanford University. She was blindfolded throughout the procedure, hemorrhaged and ended up on the intensive care ward of Stanford hospital. Fadiman's abortion experience was the catalyst behind making the documentary film: When Abortion Was Illegal: Untold Stories. The film was nominated for an OSCAR in the Best Documentary Short category in 1993.

=== Filmography ===
- Chef Darren: The Challenge of Profound Deafness (2018)
- A Daring Journey: From Immigration to Education (2015)
- Butterfly Town, USA (2015)
- Shattering the Myth of Aging: Senior Games Celebrate Healthy Lifestyles, Competition and Community (2010)
- Motherhood by Choice, Not Chance (2010)
- Reclaiming Their Voice: The Native American Vote in New Mexico & Beyond (2009)
- Stealing America: Vote by Vote (2008)
- Breathe Easy (2007)
- Moment by Moment: The Healing Journey of Molly Hale (2005)
- Seeds of Hope: HIV/AIDS in Ethiopia (2006) A five-film series
- Woman by Woman: New Hope for the Villages of India (2001)
- Fix-It Shops: An Endangered Species (1999)
- The Fragile Promise of Choice: Abortion in the United States Today (1996)
- From Danger to Dignity: The Fight for Safe Abortion (1995)
- When Abortion Was Illegal: Untold Stories (1992)
- Why Do These Kids Love School? (1990)
- World Peace is A Local Issue (1983) (digitally remastered in 2013 and released in 2014)
- Celebration: I Am All of These (1983)
- Peace: A Conscious Choice (1982)
- Radiance: The Experience of Light (1978)

== Other projects ==
- Producing with Passion: Making Films That Change the World (2008) with Tony Levelle, ISBN 978-1932907445
- Open Secret: The Poetry of Rumi (1989 and 1993) with Coleman Barks

=== Awards ===
- OSCAR nomination, Best Documentary Short. (1992)
- San Francisco / Northern California Emmy Award (1997)
- Gold Medal, Corporation for Public Broadcasting
- BEST DOCUMENTARY, Atlanta International Film/Video Festival
- Critics Choice Award, Broadcast Film Critics
- "FREDDIE," The International Medical Media Award
- Gold Hugo, Chicago International Film Festival
- BEST TELEVISION DOCUMENTARY, The EMMA, Exceptional Merit Media Award, National Women's Political Caucus
- Gold Apple, National Educational Media Festival
- BRONZE CHRIS, Columbus International Film Festival
- BLUE RIBBON, American Film and Video Festival
- BEST DOCUMENTARY, The "Joeys" San Jose Film Festival
- SILVER PLAQUE, Chicago Film Festival
- BRONZE STAR, WorldFest-Houston International Film Festival
- SILVER APPLE, National Educational Film and Video Festival
- GOLD MEDAL, Religious Educators Media Award
- CHRIS AWARD, Columbus Film Festival
- FIRST PRIZE, Whole Life Expo Media Festival/San Francisco
- GOLD MEDAL, Virgin Islands/Miami International Film Festival
- FIRST PLACE AWARD, Bilbao Film International Film Festival (Spain)

== Personal life ==
Fadiman's husband is James Fadiman, a published author. They have two children, Renee Fadiman and Maria Fadiman.
