= Maria Fadiman =

American ethnobotanist

- Born: Maria Grace Fadiman; July 4, 1969 (age 57)
- Occupation: Professor
- Employer: Florida Atlantic University
- Relatives: James Fadiman (father); Dorothy Fadiman (mother); Anne Fadiman (first cousin once removed); Clifton Fadiman (granduncle); William James Sidis (first cousin twice removed)
- Writing career
- Genre: ethnobotanist

Maria Grace Fadiman (born July 4, 1969) is an American ethnobotanist and Professor of Geosciences at Florida Atlantic University.

== Biography ==
Fadiman is the daughter of documentary filmmaker Dorothy Fadiman and psychologist and author James Fadiman. Clifton Fadiman was her granduncle. She is a distant cousin of Anne Fadiman and of William James Sidis, a child prodigy.

== Education and career ==
Fadiman received her AB from Vassar College, her MA from Tulane University and her PhD from the University of Texas at Austin. She was the recipient of an NSF Grant in 2000–2001, which she used for her dissertation research in Ecuador.

Fadiman joined the faculty at Florida Atlantic University in 2004. Before her appointment at FAU, she served as part-time faculty at Sonoma State University.

Since 2006, Fadiman is recognized as an Emerging Explorer by National Geographic. She was one of only eight Explorers honored by National Geographic in 2006.

Fadiman's research specializes in Latin American and African ethnobotany, with a focus on rainforest cultures. Her research and publications examine the various ways that indigenous peoples interact with plants in their daily lives, with particular emphasis on the economy and on gender roles.

In Starbucks The Way I See It No 233 she said, "I used to think that going to the jungle made my life an adventure. However, after years of unusual work in exotic places, I realize that it is not how far off I go, or how deep into the forest I walk that gives my life meaning. I see that living life fully is what makes life – anyone’s life, no matter where they do or do not go – an adventure."

== Recent publications ==
- 2005, Cultivated Food Plants: Culture and Gendered Spaces of Colonists and the Chachi in Ecuador. Journal of Latin American Geography 4(1): 43-57.
- 2004, Management, Cultivation and Domestication of Weaving Plants: Heteropsis and Astrocaryum in the Ecuadorian Rain Forest. The California Geographer 44:1-19.
- 2001, Hat weaving with Jipi, Carludovica palmate, (Cyclanthaceae) in the Yucatán Peninsula, Mexico. The Journal of Economic Botany 55(4):539-544.
