= James Fadiman =

American psychologist and writer

- Born: May 27, 1939 (age 87); New York City, US
- Occupations: Researcher, author, lecturer
- Spouse: Dorothy Fadiman
- Relatives: William Fadiman (father); Vera Racolin (mother); Anne Fadiman (first cousin); Clifton Fadiman (uncle); William James Sidis (first cousin once removed)

James Fadiman (born May 27, 1939) is an American writer known for his research on microdosing psychedelics. He co-founded the Institute of Transpersonal Psychology, which later became Sofia University.

== Early years ==
Fadiman was born in New York City to a Jewish family and grew up in Bel Air. His father, William Fadiman, was a producer, story editor, and book reviewer in Hollywood, one of his credits being The Last Frontier. His mother, Vera Racolin, was a socialite, former model, and philanthropist known for her charitable support of numerous causes, including the American Cancer Society, the American Heart Association, the American Rescue League, and the Boys & Girls Club. Both his paternal grandparents, Isadore and Grace Fadiman, and his maternal grandparents, Mandel and Natalie (Natasha) Racolin, were Russian Jewish immigrants who settled in New York City near the turn of the 20th century.

== Education/research and psychedelic counterculture ==
Fadiman received a Bachelor of Arts degree from Harvard University in 1960 and a master's degree and a doctorate (both in psychology) from Stanford University, the PhD in 1965. While in Paris in 1961, his friend and former Harvard undergraduate adviser Ram Dass (then known as Richard Alpert) introduced him to psilocybin.

As a graduate student at Stanford, Fadiman was Stewart Brand's LSD guide on Brand's first LSD trip in 1962, at Myron Stolaroff's International Foundation for Advanced Study in Menlo Park, California. While living in Menlo Park, Fadiman and his wife were Ken Kesey's Perry Lane neighbors and friends.

In 1963, Fadiman worked at Stanford's Augmentation Research Center, a division that did research on networked computing. He was also part of the team in the psychedelics in problem-solving experiment at the International Foundation for Advanced Study, which was abruptly halted in 1966.

Fadiman is a proponent of microdosing and collects anecdotal reports from those who practice it.

== Transpersonal psychology and personality theory ==
Fadiman and Robert Frager cofounded the Institute of Transpersonal Psychology (now known as Sofia University) in 1975. He was a lecturer in psychedelic studies there.

Fadiman was a president of the Association for Transpersonal Psychology. He was also a director at the Institute of Noetic Sciences from 1975 to 1977.

In 1976, Fadiman and Frager published a textbook on personality theory, Personality and Personal Growth, which was one of the first to incorporate Eastern theories of personality alongside Western approaches and the first of its kind to include chapters on women. Personality and Personal Growth has been republished in seven editions as of 2012.

== Personal life ==
Fadiman is married to documentary filmmaker Dorothy Fadiman and is the father of arts educator Renee Fadiman and Florida Atlantic University professor Maria Fadiman. His uncle was Clifton Fadiman, and he is a cousin of Anne Fadiman. His brother, Jeffrey A. Fadiman, is a professor of international marketing at San José State University and a language and area specialist of Eastern and Southern Africa, with published work on the Meru tribe of Mount Kenya.

Fadiman is the first cousin once removed of child prodigy William James Sidis. Sidis was the son of Sarah Sidis (née Mandelbaum), who was the sister of Fadiman's paternal grandmother, Grace Fadiman (née Mandelbaum).

He was also featured in the first episode of the 2022 Netflix documentary series How to Change Your Mind.

== Works ==
=== Books ===
- Transpersonal Education: A Curriculum for Feeling and Being (1976) Co-edited with Gay Hendricks. Prentice Hall, ISBN 0-1393-0461-4
- Motivation and Personality (with Robert Frager and Abraham Harold Maslow) (1987) ISBN 0-06-041987-3
- Unlimit Your Life: Setting and Getting Goals (1989) ISBN 0-890-87562-6
- Essential Sufism (1998) Castle Books ISBN 978-0785809067
- The Other Side of Haight: A Novel (2004) ISBN 0-890-87984-2
- The Psychedelic Explorer's Guide: Safe, Therapeutic, and Sacred Journeys Paperback (2011) ISBN 978-1594774027
- Personality and Personal Growth (7th Edition) (with Robert Frager) (2012) ISBN 0-13-144451-4
- Your Symphony of Selves:Discover and Understand More of Who We Are (2020) (co-authored with Jordan Gruber). ISBN 9781644110263
- Microdosing for Health, Healing, and Enhanced Performance (co-authored with Jordan Gruber) (2025) ISBN 9781250355584

=== Workshops and talks ===
- Psychedelics and Buddhism, October 12, 2012, Multidisciplinary Association for Psychedelic Studies
- Psychedelic Horizons Beyond Psychotherapy, Psychedelic Science 2013 Conference – April 2013, Multidisciplinary Association for Psychedelic Studies

=== Films ===
- Late 1960s documentary film, Drugs in Our Culture from the Prelinger Archives
- 2009 documentary film, Inside LSD from National Geographic
- 2013 documentary film, Science and Sacraments
