= Clinical pluralism =

Psychotherapeutical approach

Clinical pluralism is a term used by some psychotherapists to denote an approach to clinical treatment that would seek to remain respectful towards divergences in meaning-making. It can signify both an undertaking to negotiate theoretical difference between clinicians, and an undertaking to negotiate differences of belief occurring within the therapeutic relationship itself. While the notion of clinical pluralism is associated with the practice of psychotherapy, similar issues have been raised within the field of medical ethics (see Medical ethics § Cultural concerns).

Clinical pluralism can be applied within a particular approach to psychotherapy, such as psychoanalytic psychotherapy. Modern psychoanalytic training involves not only hours of training sessions but the use of diverse clinical practices. An example of psychoanalytic treatment following clinical pluralism is coparticipant psychoanalysis, which features an individualized treatment but is diverse in the practices employed. This technique holds that all analyses represent unique sets of practices, which depend on the varying characteristics of the personalities that make up the analytic dyad.

Clinical pluralism is also associated with eclectic and integrative psychotherapy, which are distinguished from clinical practice that follows a specific theoretical school with its own therapeutic techniques. These approaches to therapy all maintain that there is no single theory or therapeutic modality that can offer optimum efficacy.

== See also ==
- Eclecticism
- Integrative psychotherapy § Comparison with eclecticism
