= Journal of Transpersonal Psychology =

The Journal of Transpersonal Psychology
- Discipline: Transpersonal psychology
- Language: English
- Edited by: Marcie Boucouvalas

Publication details
- History: 1969
- Publisher: The Association for Transpersonal Psychology, on behalf of Sofia University (United States)
- Frequency: Biannual

Standard abbreviations
- ISO 4: J. Transpers. Psychol.

Indexing
- ISSN: 0022-524X
- OCLC no.: 1800053

Links
- Journal homepage

The Journal of Transpersonal Psychology (JTP) is a semi-annual, peer-reviewed academic journal which is published by the Association for Transpersonal Psychology (ATP). The journal is a seminal publication in the field of transpersonal psychology. According to sources the journal is addressing the interface between psychology and spirituality, and the area of spirituality as a legitimate topic for academic studies.

Its current editor is Marcie Boucouvalas. The associate editor for research is Douglas A. MacDonald

== History ==
The journal was founded by Anthony Sutich in 1969, and grew out of the humanistic psychology and counterculture of the late 1960s. According to Taylor the new journal was dedicated to the study of ultimate human capacities; unitive consciousness; peak experiences; ecstasy; mystical experiences; and self-transcendence. In the mid-1970s the journal was published by the Transpersonal Institute, now Sofia University.

== Association for Transpersonal Psychology ==
The ATP was founded in 1972 and is a membership-supported organization in the field of transpersonal psychology. The organization has also contributed material to the PsycEXTRA database. While the association was originally created with the main goal of supporting the publication of the JTP, its mission and vision have evolved over time. Both ATP and JTP are subdivisions of Transpersonal Institute, a non-profit organization.

Past presidents of the association include Steven Schmitz, Harris Friedman, David Lukoff, Stuart Sovatsky, Alyce Green, James Fadiman, Frances Vaughan, Arthur Hastings, Daniel Goleman, Robert Frager, Ronald Jue, Jeanne Achterberg and Dwight Judy.

== See also ==
- International Journal of Transpersonal Studies
