= Sofia University (California) =

Private for-profit university in Palo Alto and Costa Mesa, California

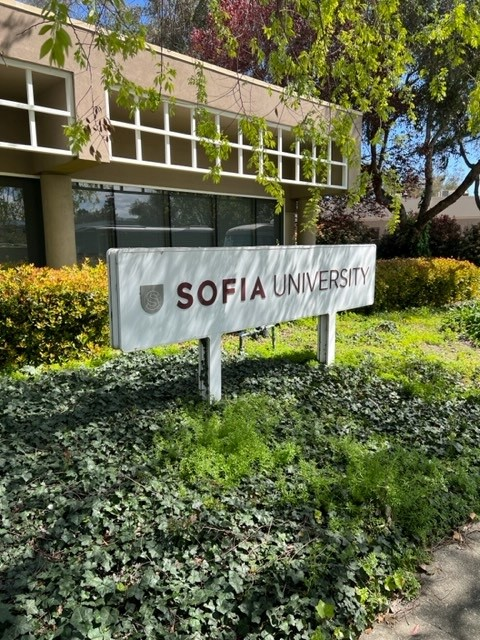
- Former names: California Institute of Transpersonal Psychology; Institute of Transpersonal Psychology
- Motto: Transformative Transpersonal Education Since 1975
- Type: Private for-profit university
- Established: 1975
- President: Carol Humphreys
- Provost: Nami Kim
- Location: Palo Alto, California, United States; 37°25′51″N 122°06′33″W
- Website: sofia.edu

Sofia University is a private for-profit university with two locations in California, one in Costa Mesa and the other in Palo Alto. It was originally founded as the California Institute of Transpersonal Psychology by Robert Frager and James Fadiman in 1975.

== History ==
=== California Institute of Transpersonal Psychology (1975–1986) ===
The institution was originally known as the California Institute of Transpersonal Psychology, one of several transpersonally-oriented institutions formed in the 1970s. The founders, Robert Frager and James Fadiman, wanted to offer the perspectives of transpersonal psychology alongside personal, therapeutic and spiritual disciplines, all within a community context.

In 1980, Jungian analyst June Singer became the director of the clinical training program. By the mid 1980s, the school was located in Menlo Park and offered a master's degree and doctoral degree in transpersonal psychology.

=== Institute of Transpersonal Psychology (1986–2012) ===
In 1986, the institution was renamed the Institute of Transpersonal Psychology.

By 1989, the institute had grown to offer a range of residential masters and doctoral programs, as well as external masters and certificate programs. It also oversaw the activities of a Transpersonal Counseling Center and hosted the Spiritual Emergence Network.

In 1992, the institute was granted candidacy by WASC. During the same year, William G. Braud and Rosemarie Anderson joined the core faculty at the institution. Braud later served as research director at the institute, as well as co-director of the institute's William James Center for Consciousness Studies.

In 1997, the institute was given initial accreditation by WASC. In 1998, Braud and Anderson released the book Transpersonal Research Methods for the Social Sciences: Honoring Human Experience, which sought to establish the field of transpersonal (or transformative) research methods.

In 2002, it was reported that 410 students were enrolled in the fall semester at the institute, which included students enrolled in the institute's online program. At this time, the institute offered programs in psychology and counseling, with an emphasis on both traditional and non-traditional psychological and spiritual models of instruction. Other certificate programs were also gradually established, such as the certificate in Spiritual Direction. The WASC accreditation was reaffirmed in 2007 and in 2011 Neal King was appointed president of the institute.

Other academic profiles that were connected to the institute include Kari Hennigan, who conducted studies in ecopsychology, and Fred Luskin, who was professor of clinical psychology.

=== Sofia University (2012–present) ===
In 2012, the institution was officially renamed Sofia University and transitioned from an institute to a university, offering both undergraduate and graduate programs. Academic programs were structured according to three main orientations:

- the Graduate School of Transpersonal Studies
- the Graduate School of Clinical & Spiritual Psychology
- the School of Undergraduate Studies

By this time, the institution was associated with the concept of spiritual psychology in the mainstream press. (Note: A New York Times correction as of August 17, 2012 states that the original article (Otterman, 2012), in some editions, misidentified Sofia University/Institute of Transpersonal Psychology in Palo Alto (California) with the Institute for Transpersonal Studies in Santa Cruz (California).)

In 2013, the school had 526 full-time-equivalent students. Liz Li was appointed president in 2014, and became the first female president of the institution. Her successor was Barry Ryan.

As of 2015, the university was reaccredited for an additional seven years by the WASC Senior College and University Commission. Peter Bemski became president in January 2018.

== Academics ==
The university consists of three schools: the Institute of Transpersonal Psychology, the Institute of Applied and Professional Programs, and Global College.

The school has expanded to include studies in:

- Computer science, including artificial intelligence, human computer interaction, big data and software design.
- Business leadership and management, and offers three degree programs in the Chinese Language (MBA, MATP, Ph.D.) applying transpersonal principles to the functional areas of business.

== See also ==
- Transpersonal
- Transpersonal psychology
