= KQEH =

Television station in San Jose, California

- San Jose–San Francisco–Oakland, California; United States
- City: San Jose, California
- Channels: Digital: 30 (UHF), shared with KQED; Virtual: 54
- Branding: KQED Plus

Programming
- Affiliations: 54.1: PBS; for others, see § Subchannels

Ownership
- Owner: KQED Inc.
- Sister stations: KQED, KQET, KQED-FM, KQEI-FM

History
- First air date: October 19, 1964
- Former call signs: KTEH (1964–2011)
- Former channel numbers: Analog: 54 (UHF, 1964–2009); Digital: 50 (UHF, until 2018)
- Former affiliations: NET (1964–1970)
- Call sign meaning: portmanteau of KQED and former KTEH call sign (meaning of KTEH not known)

Technical information
- Licensing authority: FCC
- Facility ID: 35663
- ERP: 1,000 kW
- HAAT: 511.7 m (1,678.8 ft)
- Transmitter coordinates: 37°45′19″N 122°27′10″W

Links
- Public license information: Public file; LMS
- Website: www.kqed.org/tv

KQEH (channel 54), branded as KQED Plus, is a PBS member television station licensed to San Jose, California, United States, serving the San Francisco Bay Area. It is owned by KQED Inc. alongside fellow PBS station KQED (channel 9) and NPR member KQED-FM (88.5) in San Francisco. The three stations share studios on Mariposa Street in San Francisco's Mission District and transmitter facilities atop Sutro Tower. KQEH's transmitter was originally located atop Monument Peak until January 17, 2018.

== History ==
KTEH's last logo before merging with KQED, used from 1993 through 2007

The station first signed on the air on October 19, 1964, as KTEH, originally intended to serve the South Bay. In the late 1990s, KTEH bought KCAH in Watsonville, which was founded in 1989 to serve as the PBS station for the Santa Cruz–Salinas–Monterey market. Before being acquired by KQED, KTEH maintained a Technical Volunteer program, which allowed volunteers to learn how to operate cameras, audio, shading, directing, and other production and technical responsibilities, while minimizing its costs. These volunteers made up the technical crews for all of their pledge drives and auction programming, as well as other occasional live broadcasts.

In 2006, KQED Inc. and the KTEH Foundation agreed to merge to form Northern California Public Broadcasting. As a result of the merger, KCAH changed its call letters to KQET on August 12, 2007. Subsequently, on October 1, 2007, KQET, which became a satellite of KTEH following its acquisition of the station, switched programming sources from KTEH to KQED. KQET's programming is carried on the second digital subchannel of KQED.

Last logo as KTEH, used from 2007 through June 30, 2011

In December 2010, the Board of Directors of Northern California Public Broadcasting changed the organization's name to KQED Inc. KTEH shut down its studio on Schallenberger Road, moved its operations to the KQED studio in San Francisco, changed its call letters to KQEH, and rebranded itself as "KQED Plus" on July 1, 2011, after research found that most viewers were unaware that KTEH was related to KQED; other aspects of the station's operation, including programming and staff, were not affected by this change.

== Programming ==
In April 1981, KTEH started showing the British science-fantasy show Doctor Who, which ran on the station until January 2003. On April 10, 2007, Doctor Who returned to the station with the airing of the program's 2005 revival. KTEH has also aired another British sci-fi show, Red Dwarf. In 1998, KTEH aired the entire eighth series of Red Dwarf in one night. In doing so, many episodes were shown on KTEH before their broadcast on British television.

In the mid-1990s, Scott Apel hosted airings of The Prisoner with commentary, using an episode ordering he devised. The ordering is still a popular one in the Prisoner fandom, referred to as the "KTEH order".

KTEH also has a history of airing anime. From 1996 to 2003, the station would air various anime series on Sunday nights. KTEH was notable as the station that saw the broadcast premiere of the English-subtitled Neon Genesis Evangelion, as well as the dubbed version of the Tenchi Universe TV series. Other anime aired on KTEH include Bubblegum Crisis, subtitled versions of Dirty Pair Flash, All Purpose Cultural Cat Girl Nuku Nuku, Urusei Yatsura, and Sakura Wars, and dubbed versions of Key the Metal Idol, Serial Experiments Lain, City Hunter, Ruin Explorers, Please Save My Earth, Ranma ½, and Generator Gawl. KTEH also aired Robotech, an English production that was originally a combination of three similar, but otherwise unrelated anime series (Super Dimensional Fortress Macross, Super Dimensional Cavalry Southern Cross, and Genesis Climber Mospeada) that originally aired on commercial broadcast television in the United States.

Karen Roberts was the person responsible for acquiring the programming for both British television series and Japanese anime.

=== Local productions ===
KTEH has produced many television programs over the years, some of which have been nationally broadcast. Its current production schedule includes:

- This is Us (not to be confused with the NBC series of the same name) – an Emmy Award-winning show featuring profiles of remarkable people and places in Northern California.
- Saving the Bay – an Emmy Award-winning documentary about San Francisco Bay which went on to a national release in 2011.
- video i – an award-winning showcase of documentaries, dramas, and experimental films.
- KTEH Cooks with Garlic – local viewers preparing their favorite garlic recipes. Winner of the first PBS Interactive Innovation of the Year Award.
- Moneytrack – an ongoing series on investment management.

KTEH was the production company for several other productions:

- The War: Nisei Soldiers (2007)
- The War: Soldados (2007)
- Dave Tatsuno: Movies and Memories (2006)
- Cosmopolitan (2003)
- Return to the Valley (2003)
- Rich Dad, Poor Dad with Robert Kiyosaki (2001)
- Adventures with Kanga Roddy (1998)
- The First Seven Years (1998)
- Cadillac Desert (1997)
- The Battle for Mono Lake (1997)
- The Men Who Sailed the Liberty Ships (1994)
- When Abortion Was Illegal: Untold Stories (1992)
- The Day After Trinity (1981)
- Tomorrow/Today (1981)
- Kaleidoscope (1979)
- Fluorocarbons: The Unfinished Agenda (1977)
- The Aerosol Factor (1975)

== Technical information ==
=== Subchannels ===
Subchannels of KQED, KQEH, and KQET
| Subchannel | | | Res. | Short name | | | Programming |
| KQED | KQEH | KQET | Res. | KQED | KQEH | KQET | Programming |
|---|---|---|---|---|---|---|---|
| 9.1 | 54.2 | 25.1 | 1080i | KQED-HD | | KQET-HD | PBS (KQED) |
| 9.2 | 54.1 | 25.2 | 1080i | KQED+HD | | KQET+HD | PBS (KQEH) |
| 9.3 | 54.3 | 25.3 | 480i | WORLD | | | KQED World |
| 9.4 | 54.4 | 25.4 | 480i | KIDS | | | KQED Kids |

=== Analog-to-digital conversion ===
KQEH (as KTEH) shut down its analog signal, over UHF channel 54, on June 12, 2009, as part of the federally mandated transition from analog to digital television. The station's digital signal remained on its pre-transition UHF channel 50, using virtual channel 54. On January 17, 2018, KQEH ceased broadcasting on UHF channel 50 from Monument Peak Tower near Milpitas, and moved to UHF channel 30 broadcasting from Sutro Tower in San Francisco, a frequency shared with KQED.

== See also ==
- Cosmopolitan
