= International Journal of Transpersonal Studies =

- Discipline: Transpersonal studies
- Language: English
- Edited by: Glenn Hartelius

Publication details
- History: 1982-present
- Publisher: Floraglades Foundation
- Frequency: Biannual

Standard abbreviations
- ISO 4: Int. J. Transpers. Stud.

Indexing
- ISSN: 1321-0122 (print); 1942-3241 (web)
- LCCN: sn98005977
- OCLC no.: 909884163

Links
- Journal homepage

The International Journal of Transpersonal Studies is a biannual peer-reviewed academic journal covering theory, research, practice, and discourse in the area of transpersonal studies. It is the official journal of the International Transpersonal Association, is published by Floraglades Foundation, and is sponsored in part by the Attention Strategies Institute and distributed through Digital Commons at the California Institute of Integral Studies. The editor-in-chief is Glenn Hartelius (California Institute of Integral Studies).

== Abstracting and indexing ==
The journal is abstracted and indexed in PsycINFO, Scopus, ATLA Religion Database, EBSCO databases, and the MLA International Bibliography.

== See also ==
- Journal of Transpersonal Psychology
