= Robert A. McDermott =

Robert McDermott is retired American academic. He is president emeritus of the California Institute of Integral Studies in San Francisco where he also served as a professor of philosophy and religion.

== Biography ==
McDermott earned a Master of Arts from Emory University and received his PhD in 1969 in philosophy from Boston University.

He was an assistant professor of Indian and Western philosophy at Manhattanville College from 1964 to 1971. During this period, he was secretary of the American Academy of Religion from 1968 to 1971.

McDermott was a professor and later chair of the Department of Philosophy at Baruch College, CUNY where he taught from 1971 to 1990, at which point he was granted emeritus status. While at Baruch, he served as secretary treasurer of the Society for Asian and Comparative Philosophy from 1972 to 1976.

McDermott served as president of the California Institute of Integral Studies from 1990 to 1999 and remained on the faculty until his retirement in 2022.

He is the founding chair of the board of Sophia Project (two homes in Oakland, California, for mothers and children at risk of homelessness), and has been chair of the board and president of many other institutions. He is a teacher and former board chair of the Rudolf Steiner Institute.

He has written a number of books, as well as essays published in scholarly journals and anthologies. His essays have appeared in International Philosophical Quarterly, Cross Currents, Journal of the American Academy of Religion, and Philosophy East and West.

Topics on which he has written or lectured include the evolution of consciousness, the spiritual mission of America, classic and modern spirituality and spiritual masters (East and West), Sri Aurobindo, and Rudolf Steiner and Anthroposophy.

== Bibliography ==
- Radhakrishnan (1970)
- The Essential Aurobindo (1974)
- The Essential Steiner (1984)
- Introduction to William James, Essays in Psychical Research (1986)
- Four books published by Steinerbooks:
1. The Bhagavad Gita and the West (2006)
2. Buddha and Christ (2007)
3. The New Essential Steiner (2007)
4. Steiner and Anthroposophy (2008)
