= List of hospitals in Maryland =

This is a list of hospitals in the U.S. state of Maryland, sorted by location. Information on date opened has been lifted from each extant article where available.

== Aberdeen (Harford County) ==
- University of Maryland Upper Chesapeake Medical Center Aberdeen (opened 2024)

== Annapolis (Anne Arundel County) ==
- Anne Arundel Medical Center (opened 1902; private, non-profit)

== Baltimore ==
- Baltimore VA Medical Center
- Grace Medical Center (opened 1919)
- Greater Baltimore Medical Center (opened 1965)
- Johns Hopkins Bayview Medical Center (opened 1773)
- Johns Hopkins Hospital (opened 1889)
- Kennedy Krieger Institute (opened 1937)
- Levindale Hebrew Geriatric Center and Hospital (opened 1890)
- MedStar Good Samaritan Hospital (opened 1968)
- MedStar Harbor Hospital (opened 1903)
- MedStar Union Memorial Hospital (opened 1854)
- Mercy Medical Center (opened 1874 through merger of Washington Medical College and College of Physicians and Surgeons)
- Mt. Washington Pediatric Hospital (opened 1922)
- R Adams Cowley Shock Trauma Center (opened 1960)
- St. Agnes Hospital (opened 1823)
- Sinai Hospital (opened 1866)
- University of Maryland Medical Center (opened 1853)
- University of Maryland Medical Center Midtown Campus (opened 1881)
- University of Maryland Rehabilitation & Orthopaedic Institute (opened circa 1863)

== Bel Air (Harford County) ==
- University of Maryland Upper Chesapeake Medical Center Bel Air

== Berlin (Worcester County) ==
- Atlantic General Hospital

== Bethesda (Montgomery County) ==
- National Institutes of Health Clinical Center (opened 1953)
- Suburban Hospital (opened 1943)
- Walter Reed National Military Medical Center (opened 1940)

== Cambridge (Dorchester County) ==
- Eastern Shore Hospital Center (opened 1912)
- University of Maryland Shore Medical Center at Cambridge (opened 2021)

== Catonsville (Baltimore County) ==
- Spring Grove Hospital Center (opened 1797)

== Chestertown (Kent County) ==
- University of Maryland Shore Medical Center at Chestertown

== Cheverly (Prince George's County) ==
- Gladys Spellman Specialty Hospital & Nursing Center

== Clinton (Prince George's County) ==
- MedStar Southern Maryland Hospital Center (opened 1977)

== Columbia (Howard County) ==
- Johns Hopkins Howard County Medical Center (opened 1973)

== Cumberland (Allegany County) ==
- Brandenburg Center
- Thomas B. Finan Center (opened 1979)
- UPMC Western Maryland (opened 2009)

== Easton (Talbot County) ==
- University of Maryland Shore Medical Center at Easton

== Elkton (Cecil County) ==
- Union Hospital

== Ellicott City (Howard County) ==
- Sheppard Pratt at Ellicott City (opened after 1939)

== Fort Washington (Prince George's County) ==
- Adventist HealthCare Fort Washington Medical Center

== Frederick (Frederick County) ==
- Frederick Health Hospital

== Germantown (Montgomery County) ==
- Holy Cross Germantown Hospital

== Glen Burnie (Anne Arundel County) ==
- University of Maryland Baltimore Washington Medical Center (opened 1965)

== Hagerstown (Washington County) ==
- Brook Lane Psychiatric Center
- Meritus Medical Center
- Western Maryland Hospital Center

== La Plata (Charles County) ==
- University of Maryland Charles Regional Medical Center (opened 1926)

== Lanham (Prince George's County) ==
- Doctors Community Hospital

== Largo (Prince George's County) ==
- University of Maryland Capital Region Medical Center

== Laurel (Prince George's County) ==
- University of Maryland Laurel Medical Center (opened 1978)

== Leonardtown (St. Mary's County) ==
- MedStar St. Mary's Hospital (opened 1912)

== Oakland (Garrett County) ==
- Garrett Regional Medical Center

== Olney (Montgomery County) ==
- MedStar Montgomery Medical Center (opened 1920)

== Prince Frederick (Calvert County) ==
- CalvertHealth Medical Center (opened 1919)

== Randallstown (Baltimore County) ==
- Northwest Hospital (opened 1963)

== Rockville (Montgomery County) ==
- Adventist HealthCare Rehabilitation
- Adventist HealthCare Shady Grove Medical Center (opened 1979)

== Rossville (Baltimore County) ==
- MedStar Franklin Square Hospital Center

== Salisbury (Wicomico County) ==
- Deer's Head Center
- HealthSouth Chesapeake Rehabilitation Hospital
- Holly Center
- TidalHealth Peninsula Regional (opened 1898)

== Silver Spring (Montgomery County) ==
- Adventist HealthCare White Oak Medical Center (opened 1907)
- Holy Cross Hospital (opened 1963)
- Saint Luke Institute (opened 1981)

== Sykesville (Carroll County) ==
- Springfield Hospital Center (opened 1896)

== Towson (Baltimore County) ==
- Greater Baltimore Medical Center (opened 1965)
- The Sheppard & Enoch Pratt Hospital (opened 1891)
- University of Maryland St. Joseph Medical Center (opened 1864)

== Westminster (Carroll County) ==
- Carroll Hospital (opened 1961)

== Defunct ==
- Children's Hospital
- Church Home and Hospital (1833–1999; expansion opposed, therefore closed)
- Crownsville Hospital Center (1911–2004; closed by State of Maryland)
- Edward W. McCready Memorial Hospital (circa 1924–2021; transitioned to free-standing medical facility, no longer a hospital)
- Fallston General Hospital
- Forest Haven (1925–1991; closed by order of a Federal Judge)
- Fort Howard Veterans Hospital (circa 1940–2000)
- Glenn Dale Hospital (after 1934–1981; closed due to asbestos in the building structure)
- Harford Memorial Hospital (circa 1912–2024)
- Henryton State Hospital (1922–1985; closed by State of Maryland)
- Hospital for Women of Maryland (1882–2001; repurposed into a student house facility)
- Jarvis Hospital (1862–1865; closed at the end of the Civil War)
- Liberty Medical Center
- Lutheran Hospital
- Memorial of Cumberland (1888–2009; replaced by UMPC Western Maryland)
- Pine Bluff State Hospital (1912–1977; converted to an elder care center)
- Rosewood Center (1888–2009; fires in 2006 and 2009 led to closure by State of Maryland)
- Sacred Heart (1905–1996; replaced by UMPC Western Maryland)
- University of Maryland Shore Medical Center at Dorchester (circa 1904–2021; replaced by University of Maryland Shore Medical Center at Cambridge)
- University Specialty Hospital
- Walter P Carter Center (1976–2009; converted to an outpatient treatment facility)
- Washington County Hospital
