= Northwest Hospital =

Northwest Hospital may refer to:

- Northwest Hospital (Randallstown, Maryland), the former Baltimore County General Hospital, now part of LifeBridge Health
- Northwest Hospital & Medical Center, Seattle, Washington
- North West Regional Hospital, Tasmania
