= UMMS =

UMMS is an initialism, it may stand for:-

- University of Massachusetts Medical School
- University of Maryland Medical System
- University of Michigan Medical School
- Minsk International Airport - ICAO code UMMS
