= Sheppard Pratt at Elkridge =

Geography
- Location: 7220 Discovery Dr., Elkridge, Maryland, United States
- Coordinates: 39°11′33″N 76°46′03″W

Organization
- Type: Psychiatric hospital
- Affiliated university: Sheppard Pratt

Services
- Beds: 100

History
- Founded: 2020

Links
- Website: http://www.sheppardpratt.org/
- Lists: Hospitals in Maryland

Sheppard Pratt at Elkridge is a private psychiatric hospital in Elkridge, Maryland. The hospital serves as a replacement location for nearby Sheppard Pratt at Ellicott City.

== Background ==
In December 2010, Sheppard Pratt Health System announced plans to move its 92-bed facility at Taylor Manor in Ellicott City to a new location in Elkridge, Maryland. With its lease expiring at the end of 2018, the hospital began searching for a replacement location. A 40-acre parcel in located southwest of the junction of Interstate 95 and Maryland Route 100 was purchased for $9 million. The healthcare provider has cited the move as a way to expand access to its services to a larger population. Master plans have estimated that the new facility will cost greater than $100 million. As of 2025, the hospital is open.

== See also ==
- The Sheppard and Enoch Pratt Hospital
- Sheppard Pratt at Ellicott City
