= University of Maryland Laurel Medical Center =

- UMMS.ORG

Geography
- Location: Laurel, Maryland, United States
- Coordinates: 39°05′12″N 76°52′53″W

Organization
- Type: Community
- Affiliated university: University of Maryland School of Medicine

Services
- Emergency department: Yes
- Beds: 24 treatment bays; 10 short-stay beds

History
- Former names: Laurel Regional Hospital; Greater Laurel-Beltsville Hospital
- Opened: June 4, 2023 (new facility); Originaily 1978; 48 years ago

Links
- Website: Official website
- Lists: Hospitals in Maryland

University of Maryland Laurel Medical Center is a free-standing emergency care facility that also provides outpatient clinical and surgical services. Located in unincorporated Prince George's County, Maryland, near Laurel, it previously served as a community hospital.

== History ==
Laurel Regional Hospital was proposed in 1972. Construction funds were approved by Prince George's County Executive Winfield M. Kelly Jr. in 1975 for a $14.5 million hospital. The building was constructed in 1978 as the "Greater Laurel-Beltsville Hospital" for $20 million.

In 1983, the Prince George's council created the Community Hospital and Health Care corporation to manage the county's three hospitals. In July 1985, the Hospital Corporation of America was hired to manage the hospital system. Winfield M. Kelly Jr. was appointed chairman of the board and 22 members volunteered to resign. In 1993, Kelly became president of Dimensions Healthcare which took over management of Prince George's hospitals; he left Dimensions in mid-2003.

=== Specialty and wound care ===
In July 2011, the Gladys Spellman Specialty Care Unit relocated to Laurel Regional Hospital from Cheverly, Maryland, where it had been for 43 years. The fourth-floor unit was named for former politician Gladys Noon Spellman.

The hospital is home since 1995 to a specialty outpatient Wound Care and Hyperbaric Medicine center. The center houses two monoplace hyperbaric chambers which are used for special kinds of advanced wound healing. The center received Center of Distinction Status for 2015 by its Healogics network after 12 consecutive months of "patient satisfaction higher than 92 percent, and a minimum wound healing rate of at least 91 percent within 30 median days to heal."

=== Transition to medical center ===
On July 31, 2015, Dimensions Healthcare announced its decision to close the hospital and retain only outpatient services until a new ambulatory surgery center is built in 2018. On July 18, 2016, a plan was announced by Laurel officials that would result in the hospital's being operated by the University of Maryland Medical System. On September 1, 2017, UMMS announced its ownership of Dimensions Healthcare, renamed "University of Maryland Capital Region Health". With this change, the Laurel hospital's name became University of Maryland Laurel Regional Hospital.

In September 2018, Laurel Regional received approval from the Maryland Health Care Commission to begin building a medical center on the campus, after filing a request in April. Inpatient medical and surgical units and behavioral health services moved to UM Prince George's Hospital Center by November, while some other programs remained at the hospital during transition, including the wound care center and emergency services. Construction began in March 2021, and a new 83,742-square-foot (7,780 m^{2}) medical center building opened on June 4, 2023. Future plans include construction of a new medical office building, and demolition of the old hospital as the new campus continues to grow.
