= Almshouses in Maryland =

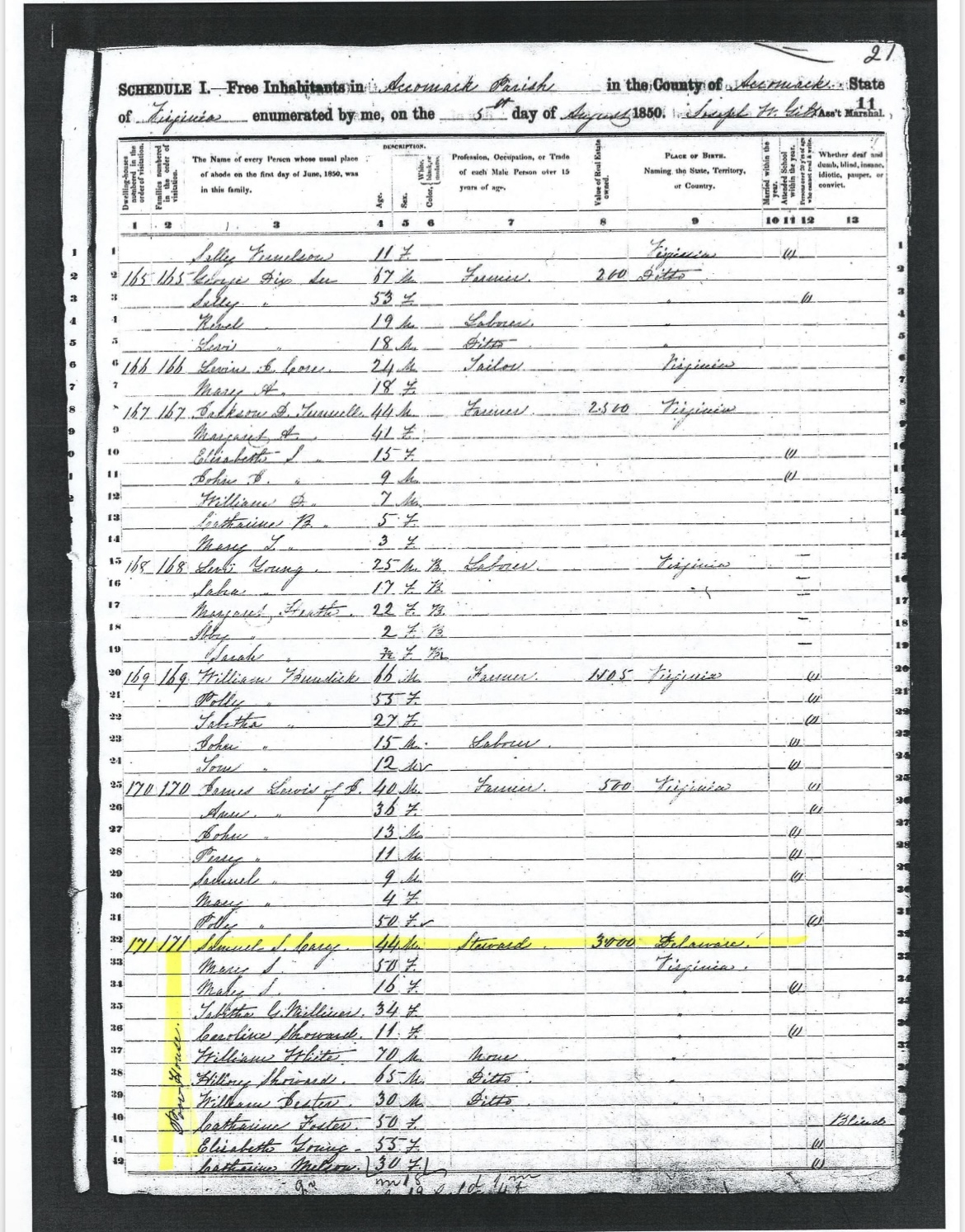
1850 Almshouse Ledger from Accomack County Virginia.

Almshouses were established as charitable housing for the elderly in Maryland. Conditions were generally quite poor due to the lack of care and funding. Almshouses fell into disuse and were discontinued in Maryland in the 20th century.

== Almshouse farms in the Delmarva Peninsula ==
Somerset County, Worcester County and Machipongo are three areas almshouses used to be located in. Almshouses were a place for "poverty ridden elderly who lacked relatives or friends". They were a place of last resort for many, also referred to as "poor houses". There was a major lack of care; they were run by counties with little funding. Historic homes were purchased and then turned into almshouses. They were given a yearly sum of $4,000. This money was the only funding given and had to help keep the inmates alive for the year. Many Almshouses were in old mansions or large houses". C. William Chancellor explored the Almshouses and reported "whoever enters here leaves hope behind".

== The Cecil County Almshouse ==
At the top of the Eastern Shore of Maryland, the state's tenth county opened a permanent almshouse for its residents in 1788. It was located about six miles north of the county seat (Elkton). Here the destitute, elderly and infirm were provided care by the county. In 1887, the county expanded its system of local relief by constructing the Cecil County Insane Asylum on part of the county farm where care was providing for people with mental illness. Gradually the State of Maryland opened state-run institutions to provide inpatient mental health and the asylum closed in 1915, The patients from the asylum were transferred to the Eastern Shore Hospital in Cambridge, MD. In 1952, the 175-acre county farm and almshouse were sold by the Cecil County Commissioners, bringing an end to this approach of providing care for the needy.

== Conditions of almshouses ==
Almshouses did not have the best conditions according to Levin A. Seabrease, who was interviewed by Orlando Wooten at the Daily Times. There were multiple occasions when an old inmate who was staying there at the time would die and the rest of the inmates would have to bury the deceased man. According to Seabrease there were about 18 to 22 residents, with half being black and half being white, described as "backwards" or "retarded". Many people residing in the Almshouses were found to have cancer that went untreated. In the 1850/60 census, the Almshouses inmates were described as "insane, poor, lame, deaf, dumb, idiotic, blind".

== Later history ==
Almshouses were eventually closed. In the early 20th century. Once vacant they awaited sale at public auctions. The homes would soon return to being places for families to live. Many "inmates" who were left were sent to the Eastern Shore Hospital Center located in Cambridge. Here there were better conditions and treatment for the patients.
