= UPMC Western Maryland =

- UPMC
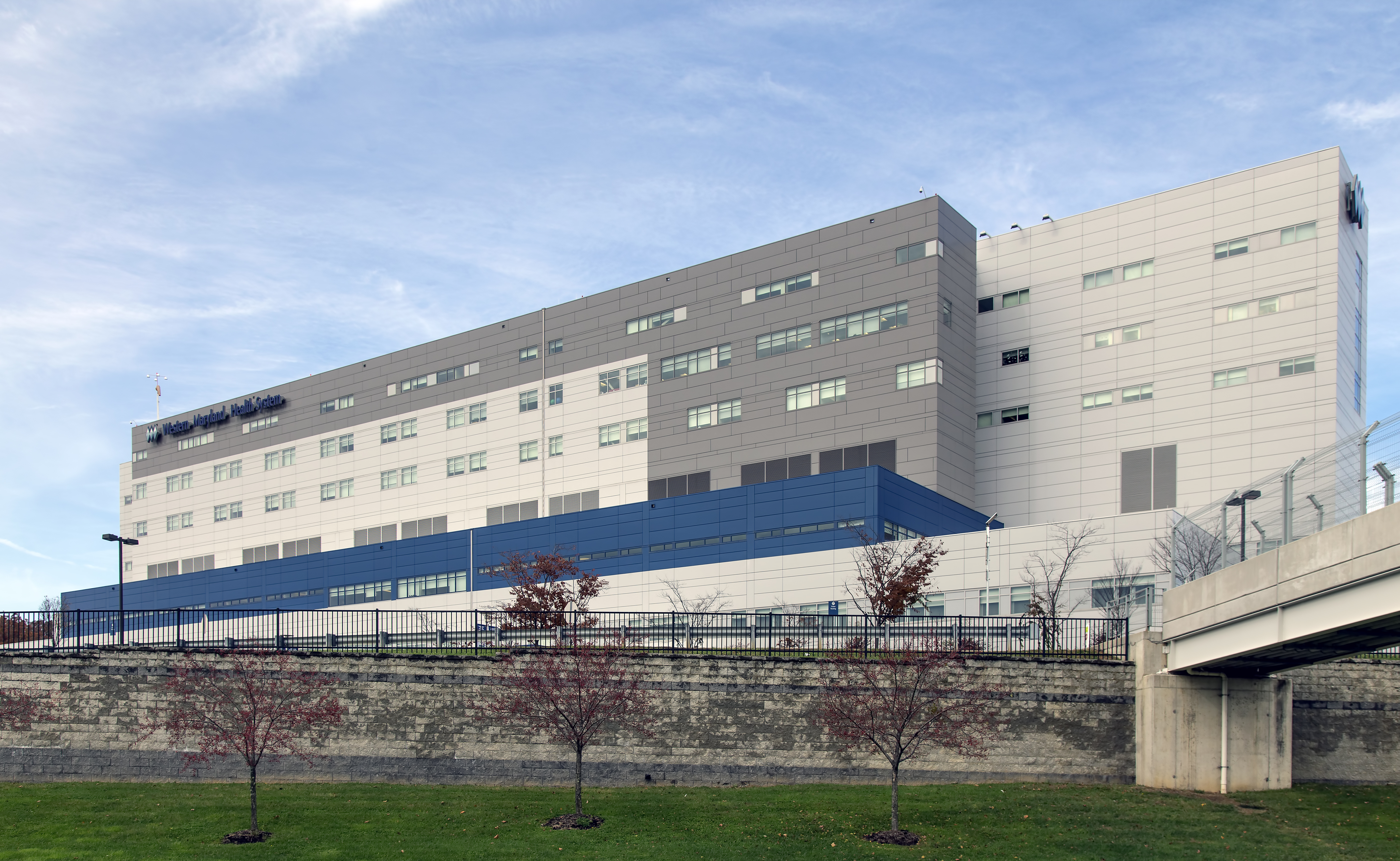

Geography
- Location: 12500 Willowbrook Rd, Cumberland, Maryland, United States
- Coordinates: 39°38′54″N 78°43′58″W

Organization
- Care system: Nonprofit
- Type: Community-based

Services
- Emergency department: Level III Trauma Center
- Beds: 200

History
- Founded: 2009

Links
- Website: wmhs.com
- Lists: Hospitals in Maryland
- Other links: List of hospitals in Maryland

UPMC Western Maryland is a hospital and health system located in Cumberland, Maryland, in Allegany County. The facility, which opened on November 21, 2009, is part of the University of Pittsburgh Medical Center (UPMC) system as of February 3, 2020. UPMC Western Maryland was originally established as a combination of Memorial Hospital (Cumberland) and Sacred Heart Hospital (Cumberland), both of which are now closed. It is sometimes confused with Western Maryland Hospital Center, a state-run rehabilitation hospital located in Hagerstown, Maryland.

== History ==
Established as the Western Maryland Hospital in 1888, Memorial Hospital moved to its current location on Memorial Avenue in Cumberland, Maryland in 1929 and was renamed in honor of those who died in World War I. Memorial Hospital was once owned and operated by the City of Cumberland and became a private non-profit organization in the early 1980s. Afterwards, Memorial was owned by the Cumberland Memorial Hospital Corporation.

Sacred Heart Hospital was first incorporated as Allegany Hospital in 1905 and moved from its original site on Decatur Street to the Seton Drive facility in 1967. The Daughters of Charity were asked to come to Cumberland to operate the hospital in 1911. Between 1935 and 2006, the hospital was known as Sacred Heart Hospital. The hospital was briefly known as WMHS Braddock Campus before the opening of the Western Maryland Regional Medical Center in 2009.

In an effort to effectively manage local healthcare resources, Cumberland Memorial Hospital Corporation and Sacred Heart Hospital joined in April 1996 to form the Western Maryland Health System (WMHS). Working together, the two hospitals were able to expand the range of healthcare services available to local residents and successfully meet the challenges associated with an ever-changing healthcare industry.

In 2005, the Western Maryland Health System made the decision to build a new hospital in Cumberland that would replace both Memorial and Sacred Heart hospitals. As their original facilities were less than two blocks apart in the early 20th century, both hospitals in a sense would come full circle by becoming a single hospital. In 2015 the Western Maryland Health System was recognized by Healthgrades as one of America's 50 Best hospitals for cardiac surgery.

Western Maryland Health System entered into a clinical affiliation agreement with UPMC in February 2018. In March 2019, WMHS signed a non-binding letter of intent to formally integrate into the UPMC system. The affiliation was touted by WMHS president and CEO Barry Ronan who stated that "since we became clinically affiliated with UPMC in 2018, we have a stronger clinical and operational position, allowing a broad range of nationally recognized care here locally for the people of Allegany County and surrounding counties in Maryland, Pennsylvania and West Virginia." On February 3, 2020, Western Maryland Health System became part of the UPMC system and was renamed UPMC Western Maryland.

== Construction of the new hospital ==
On October 25, 2006, the Western Maryland Health System broke ground on the construction of a new hospital. The location on Willowbrook Road was chosen due to its proximity to the Allegany County Health Department, Allegany College, which has a nursing program, and the Thomas B. Finan Center, the local inpatient psychiatric hospital.

The project involved the reuse of several large buildings, including one previously used as the corporate headquarters of The Kelly Springfield Tire Company as well as another that was formerly a call center used by M&T Bank. Because the site of the Allegany County Health Department was both an aging facility as well as the optimal location for a hospital, the Allegany Health Department was relocated to the first floor of the former Kelly building as well as the building formerly used as a tire testing facility. The Allegany Health Department was then demolished to make way for the new hospital.

On November 21, 2009, the Western Maryland Regional Medical Center opened on Willowbrook Road in Cumberland, effectively consolidating the Western Maryland Health System within the city into one centralized facility. By 3:30 PM that same day, all patients from both Memorial Hospital and Sacred Heart Hospital (WMHS Braddock Campus) had been moved to the new hospital and the two facilities were closed.

== Health system ==
Western Maryland Health System Administrative Center (Cumberland, Maryland)

The UPMC Western Maryland operations include Frostburg Nursing and Rehabilitation Center, an 88-bed nursing home providing long-term care located in Frostburg, Maryland. UPMC Western Maryland also provides urgent care services in Frostburg, Maryland, at its Frostburg Medical Center as well as in nearby Mineral County, West Virginia, at its Hunt Club Medical Center. UPMC Western Maryland also operates four primary care centers for patients 18 years of age and older.
