= Memorial Hospital (Cumberland) =

- Western Maryland Health System
- Memorial Hospital

Geography
- Location: 600 Memorial Ave., Cumberland, Maryland, United States
- Coordinates: 39°38′34″N 78°45′6″W

Organization
- Type: General

History
- Former name: Western Maryland Hospital
- Opened: 1888 (original location); 1929 (relocated)
- Closed: November 21, 2009
- Demolished: 2014

Links
- Lists: Hospitals in Maryland

Memorial Hospital is a defunct hospital that once served the Greater Cumberland, Maryland region in the USA. It was formerly operated by the Western Maryland Health System. The building is currently owned by the City of Cumberland, Maryland.

Established as the Western Maryland Hospital in 1888, Memorial Hospital moved to its location on Memorial Avenue in Cumberland in 1929. It was renamed in honor of those who died in World War I. Memorial Hospital was once operated by the City of Cumberland and became a private non-profit organization in the early 1980s. It was then operated by the Cumberland Memorial Hospital Corporation.

To manage local healthcare resources effectively, Memorial and Sacred Heart Hospital joined in April 1996 to form the Western Maryland Health System (WMHS). Working together, the two hospitals expanded the range of healthcare services available to local residents and successfully met the challenges associated with an ever-changing healthcare industry. One way this was accomplished was by assigning specialty centers to each hospital. The Memorial Campus had specialty centers for Children's and Adolescents' Health, Orthopedic and Joint Reconstruction, Trauma Services, and Women's Health, while the Sacred Heart Campus specialized in Behavioral Health, Cardiac Services, Oncology Services, and Outpatient Services. In 2006, work began on a new facility on Willowbrook Road in Cumberland to consolidate the Western Maryland Health System within the city into one centralized facility.

On November 21, 2009, the Western Maryland Regional Medical Center opened. As of 3:30 PM, that same day, all patients from both Memorial Hospital and Sacred Heart Hospital (WMHS Braddock Campus) had been moved to the new hospital and the two facilities were closed.

The campus, which the City of Cumberland still owns, was under lease to development company Ridgecrest Investments Inc., who in turn leased out space to several private tenants for the three years following the hospital's closing. The agreement between the city and Ridgecrest Investments was terminated in early 2012 due to the low percentage of the site being leased to tenants. A few months later, all tenants were told to vacate the site by the end of the year as the city works to divest itself of the property. The agreement between the city and WMHS upon the closure of the hospital does not allow the site to be used as a hospital or any other type of facility that would compete with the services of Western Maryland Regional Medical Center. The hospital buildings were demolished in 2014. Various proposals to develop the city owned site have been investigated in the years since. The latest project to develop 250 housing units was terminated in October 2024 and the site remains vacant.
