= WMHS Braddock Campus (Cumberland, Maryland) =

- Western Maryland Health System
- WMHS Braddock Campus

Geography
- Location: 900 Seton Drive, Cumberland, Maryland, United States
- Coordinates: 39°39′19.5″N 78°47′44″W

History
- Former names: Allegany Hospital (1905-1935); Sacred Heart Hospital (1935-2006)
- Opened: 1905 (original location); 1967 (relocated)
- Closed: November 21, 2009
- Demolished: 2015

Links
- Lists: Hospitals in Maryland

Western Maryland Health System Braddock Campus was a hospital that served the Greater Cumberland, Maryland region in the United States.

== History ==
First incorporated as Allegany Hospital in 1905, the Daughters of Charity were asked to come to Cumberland to operate the hospital in 1911. The hospital was renamed as Sacred Heart Hospital in 1935. It moved from its original site on Decatur Street to the Seton Drive facility in 1967. Sacred Heart Hospital became part of the Daughters of Charity National Health System when the national system was formed in 1986. In 1999, the Daughters of Charity National Health System merged with the Sisters of St. Joseph Health System to create Ascension Health, one of the largest not-for-profit healthcare systems in the country.

In an effort to effectively manage local healthcare resources, Memorial Hospital (Cumberland) and Sacred Heart Hospital joined together in April 1996 to form the Western Maryland Health System (WMHS). Working together, the two hospitals were able to expand the range of healthcare services available to local residents and successfully meet the challenges associated with an ever-changing healthcare industry. One way this was accomplished was by assigning specialty centers to each hospital. The Memorial Campus had specialty centers for Children's and Adolescents' Health, Orthopedic and Joint Reconstruction, Trauma Services, and Women's Health, while the Sacred Heart Campus specialized in Behavioral Health, Cardiac Services, Oncology Services, and Outpatient Services.

In 2005, the Western Maryland Health System made the decision to build a new hospital in Cumberland that would replace both Memorial and Sacred Heart hospitals. Because Memorial was a secular hospital while Sacred Heart was a Catholic hospital, this presented a unique set of circumstances for the health system. In 2006, the Daughters of Charity of the Sacred Heart of Jesus, no longer being involved with Sacred Heart Hospital, requested that the name Sacred Heart be dropped. The Western Maryland Health System then referred to Sacred Heart Hospital as WMHS Braddock Campus. Work also began that year on a new facility on Willowbrook Road in Cumberland to consolidate the Western Maryland Health System within the city into one centralized facility.

On November 21, 2009, the Western Maryland Regional Medical Center opened. By 3:30 pm that day, all patients from both Memorial Hospital and WMHS Braddock Campus had been moved to the new hospital and the two facilities were closed.

In December 2011, the City of Cumberland and WMHS closed a deal to swap the health system owned former Sacred Heart campus for city owned property adjacent to the new hospital. The city's acquisition of the Sacred Heart campus would provide a campus to replace the aging Allegany High School located nearby. Prospective plans for the site were to demolish the structures and use the land for a new school and athletic facilities. As of 2015, the hospital has since been demolished.
