= University of Maryland Baltimore Washington Medical Center =

- University of Maryland Medical System

Geography
- Location: Glen Burnie, Maryland, United States
- Coordinates: 39°8′17″N 76°37′21″W

Services
- Emergency department: Yes
- Beds: 272

History
- Founded: 1965

Links
- Website: www.umbwmc.org
- Lists: Hospitals in Maryland

University of Maryland Baltimore Washington Medical Center (UM BWMC) is a hospital in Glen Burnie, Maryland that is part of the University of Maryland Medical System (UMMS). This hospital opened as North Arundel Hospital in 1965 with three floors and limited acute care services. In 2000, North Arundel Hospital joined into UMMS and in 2005, the name was changed to UM Baltimore Washington Medical Center to reflect the hospital's growth in size and greater regionality from expanded services.

UM BWMC consists of:

- The original hospital building containing general medicine and surgical services
- Emergency Department
- Diabetes Center
- Tate Cancer Center
- Aiello Breast Center
- Maryland Vascular Center
- Joint Replacement Center
- Spine and Neuroscience Center
- Wound Healing Center

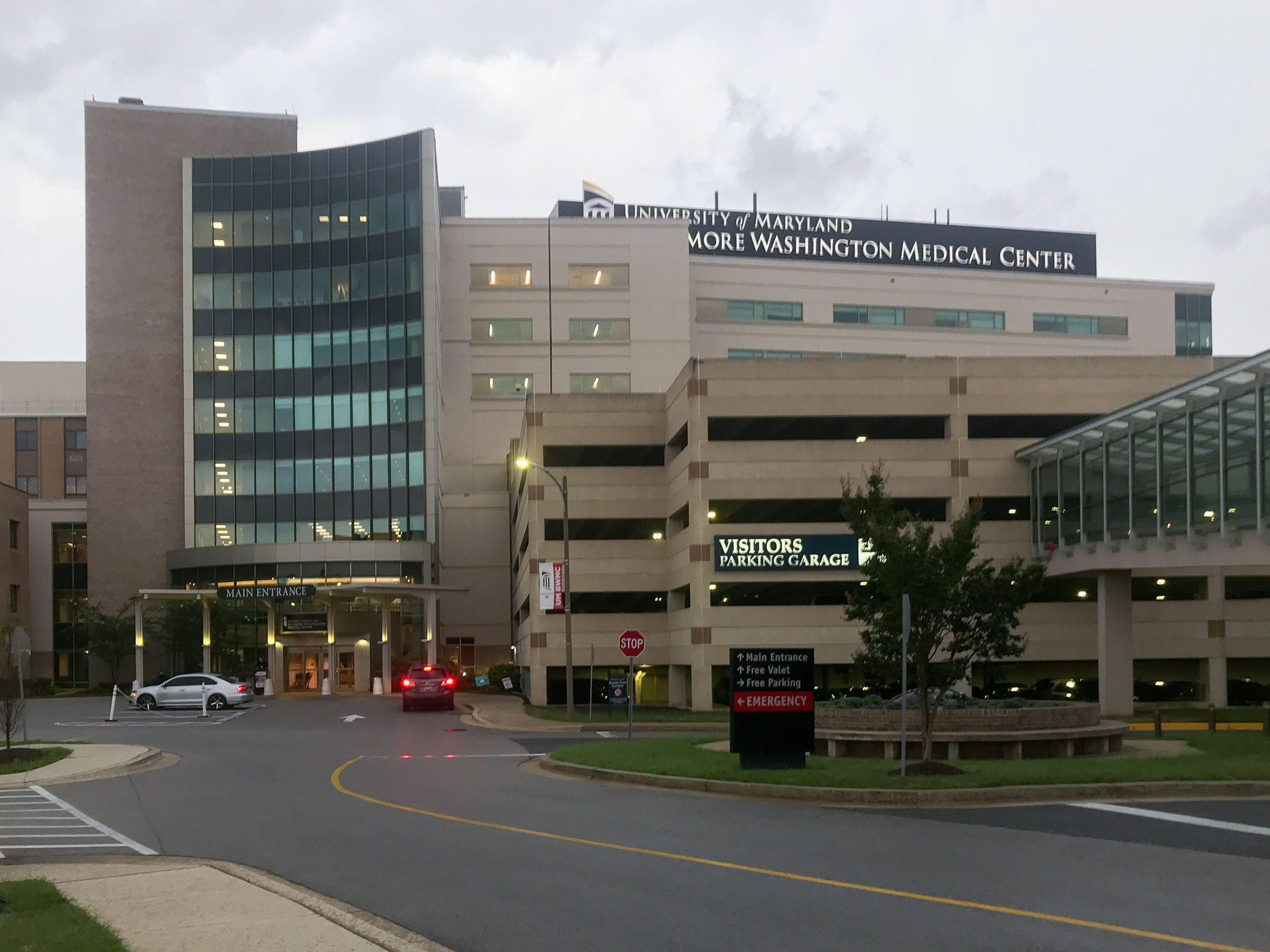
The Main Building at BWMC

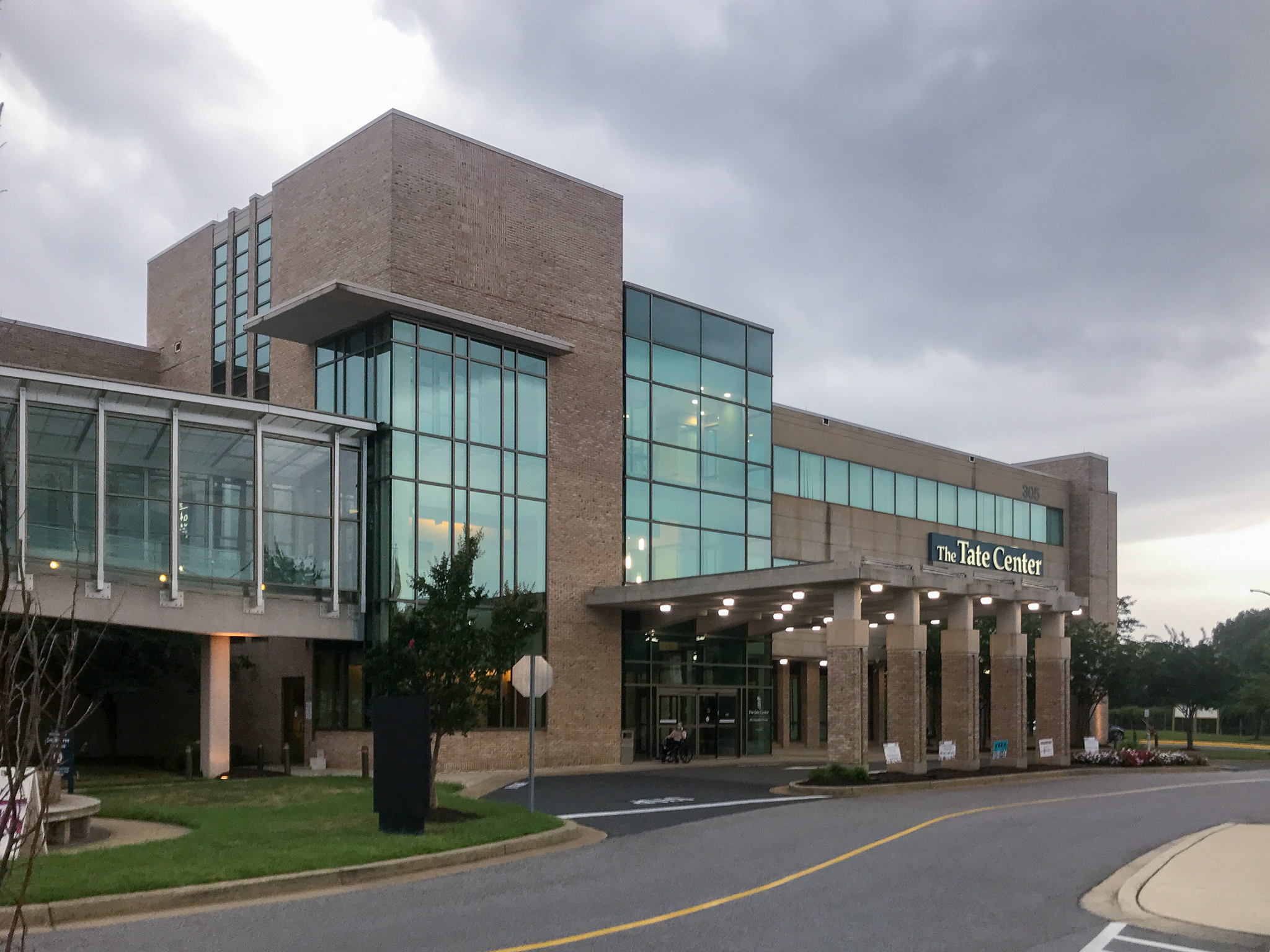
The Tate Center at BWMC

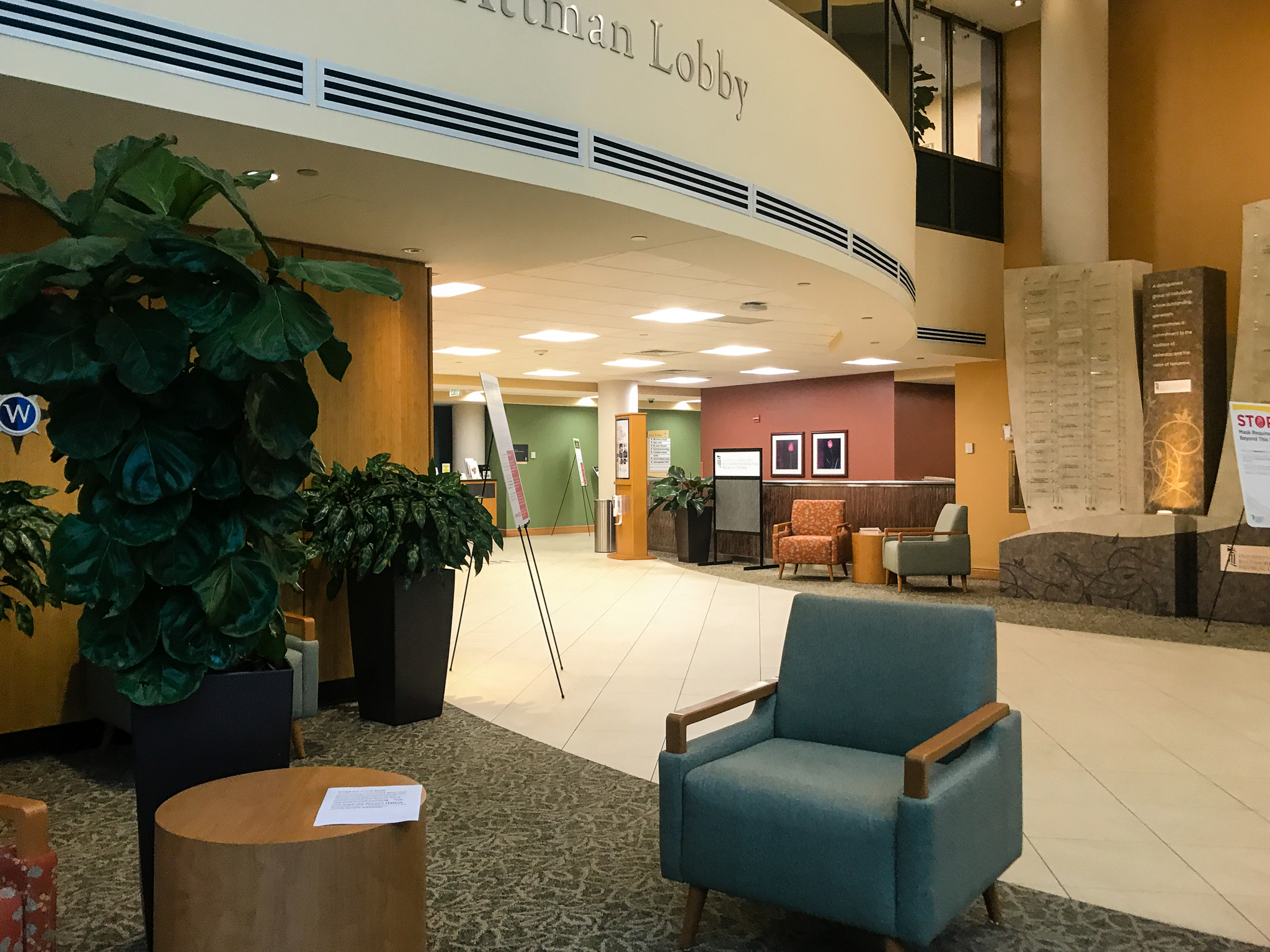
The main entrance lobby at BWMC

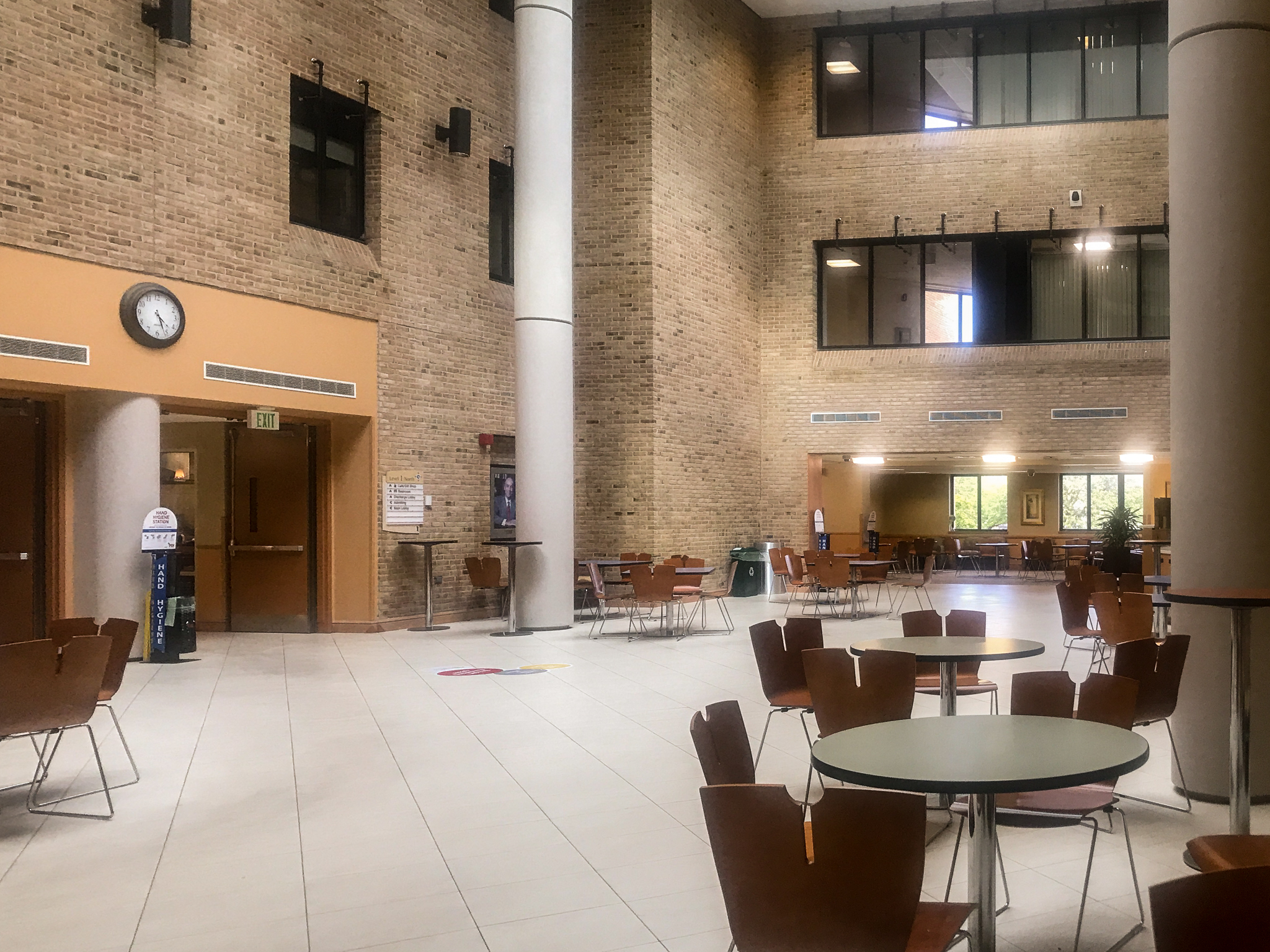
The main building atrium at BWMC, next to the gift shop

== Awards and recognition ==
In 2024, UM BWMC was named a top 5 'Best Hospital' in the state of Maryland and the Baltimore Metro Area and by U.S. News & World Report and ranked High Performing in the categories of lung cancer surgery, colon cancer surgery, chronic obstructive pulmonary disease (COPD), diabetes, heart attack, heart failure, kidney failure and pneumonia.
