= University of Maryland Medical Center Midtown Campus =

Coordinates: 39.3003°N 76.6208°W

- University of Maryland Medical System
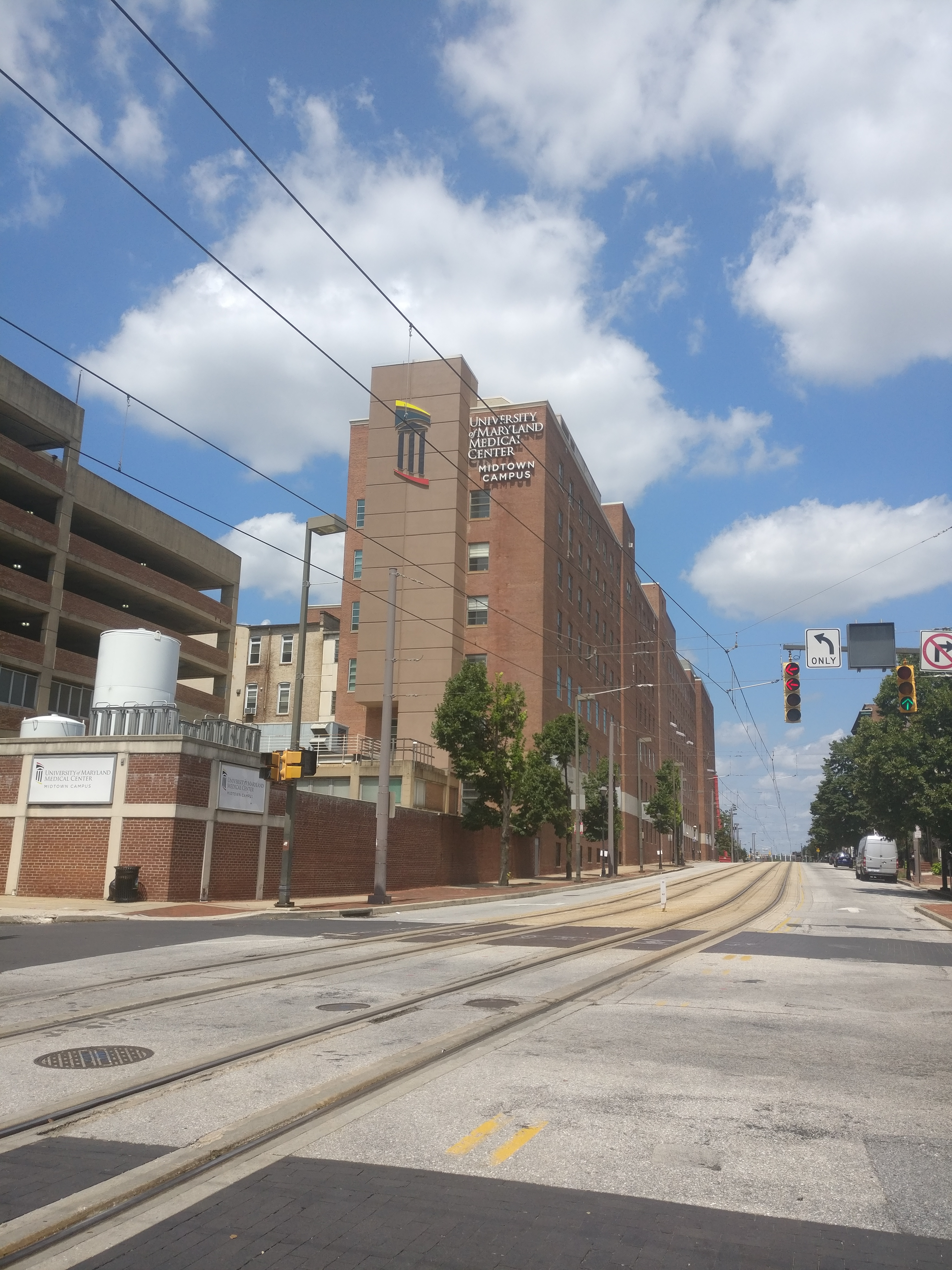

Geography
- Location: Baltimore, Maryland, United States

Organization
- Type: Teaching

Services
- Emergency department: Yes
- Beds: 177

History
- Opened: 1881

Links
- Website: https://www.umms.org/midtown/
- Lists: Hospitals in Maryland

University of Maryland Medical Center Midtown Campus (formerly Maryland General Hospital) is a hospital in the downtown area of Baltimore, Maryland. The hospital was founded for teaching purposes in 1881 by a group of local doctors. The hospital has been affiliated with the University of Maryland Medical System since 1999, and has over 1,400 employees and 500 doctors, covering 30 different specialties.

Originally known as the Baltimore Medical College, it affiliated with the University of Maryland School of Medicine in 1911. An affiliation with the Baltimore Eye, Ear, Nose and Throat Hospital began in 1965. The hospital became part of the University of Maryland Medical System in 1999.

Maryland General opened its own nursing school in 1893. The last class of the Maryland General Hospital School of Nursing graduated in January 1987, when the hospital's nursing school closed. The Obstetrics Service at Maryland General was discontinued effective June 30, 2013, due to declining volumes, despite a reputation for outstanding clinical outcomes.

On June 6, 2013, Maryland General Hospital was renamed "University of Maryland Medical Center, Midtown Campus".

== Public transit ==
The medical center is accessed by the Baltimore Light RailLink at the Mt. Vernon station at Howard and Centre Streets.
