= Frederick Health Hospital =

Geography
- Location: Frederick County, Maryland, United States
- Coordinates: 39°25′21″N 77°24′53″W

Services
- Beds: 261

Links
- Website: frederickhealth.org
- Lists: Hospitals in Maryland

Frederick Health Hospital (FHH) formerly known as Frederick Memorial Hospital (FMH) is the only hospital in Frederick County, Maryland. It is located in the city of Frederick. The President & CEO is Dr. Cheryl Cioffi.
