= University of Maryland Charles Regional Medical Center =

- University of Maryland Medical System

Geography
- Location: La Plata, Charles County, Maryland, United States
- Coordinates: 38°32′3″N 76°58′24″W

Organization
- Care system: Private, non-profit
- Type: District General

Services
- Emergency department: yes
- Beds: 109

History
- Founded: 1926

Links
- Website: www.umcharlesregional.org
- Lists: Hospitals in Maryland

University of Maryland Charles Regional Medical Center (also known as UM Charles Regional Medical Center and UM CRMC) is a hospital located in Charles County, Maryland. It was formerly called Physicians Memorial Hospital and, until recently, operated under the name Civista Medical Center. The hospital is now owned and operated by the University of Maryland Medical System, a private, not-for-profit, health system corporation. The University of Maryland Charles Regional Medical Center serves Charles County and the surrounding areas of Southern Maryland. The medical center's mission requires the organization to reinvest resources into the community by providing health education and open access to healthcare.

== History ==
In 1926, a tornado cut through Charles County leaving many dead and injured. This event motivated the county leadership to establish a hospital to serve county residents. In 1939, 408 patients were served at the hospital. Today, the hospital has the capacity to serve 42,000 patients annually. In 2008, a major renovation and expansion of Civista Medical Center was completed, which doubled the size of the facility, and included new emergency department facilities.

== University of Maryland Medical System ==
In July 2011, Civista Medical Center announced its affiliation as a member hospital of the University of Maryland Medical System (UMMS). On July 1, 2013, the Civista Medical Center began operating under the name University of Maryland Charles Regional Medical Center in the University of Maryland Medical System, becoming the first expansion of UMMS in the Washington, DC metropolitan area.
