= Sheppard Pratt at Ellicott City =

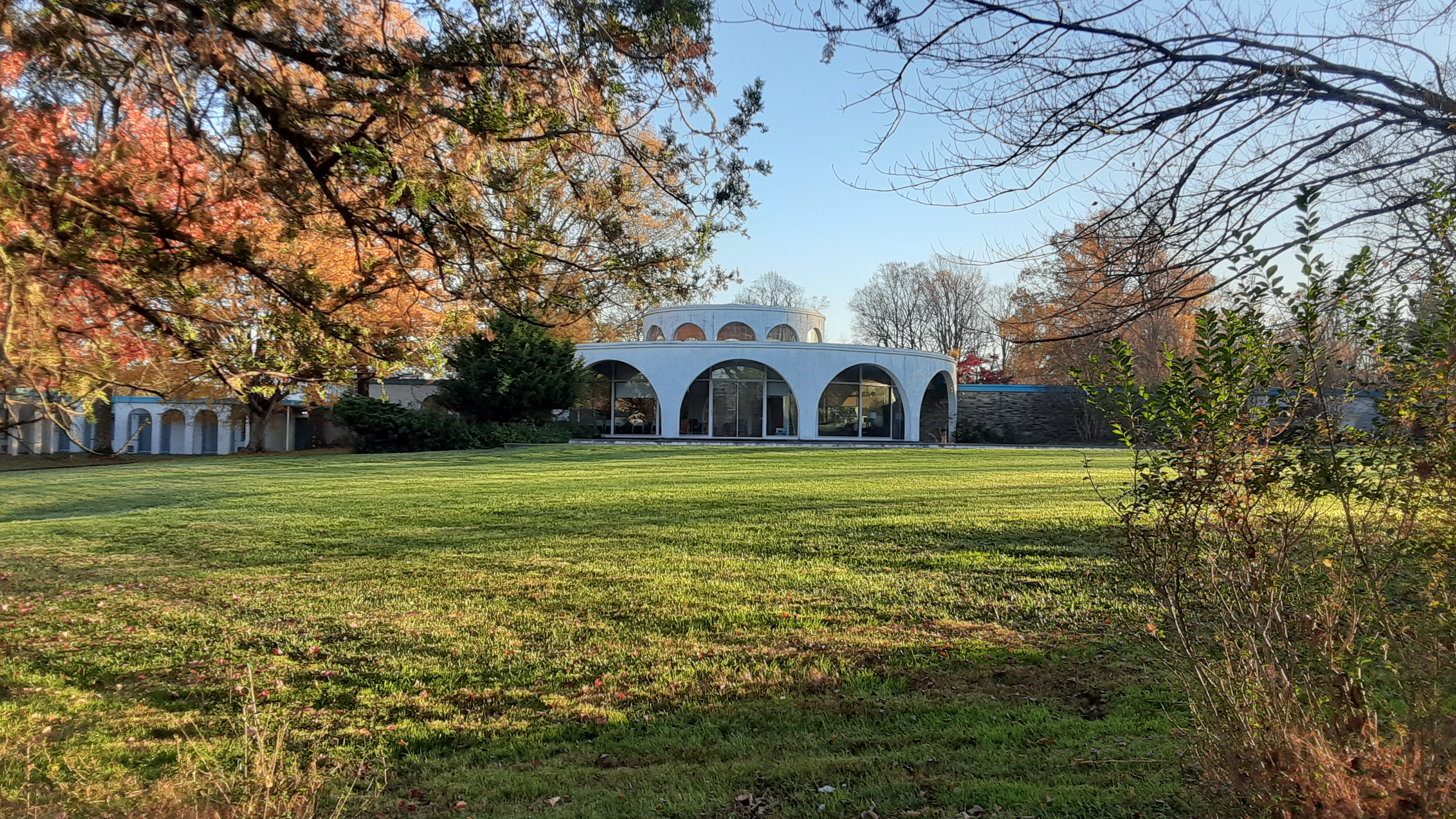
- The New Center of Taylor Manor (c. 1968)

- Location within Maryland

Geography
- Location: 4080 College Ave, Ellicott City, Maryland, United States
- Coordinates: 39.256250°N 76.793028°W

Organization
- Type: Psychiatric hospital
- Affiliated university: Sheppard Pratt

Services
- Beds: 50

Links
- Website: http://www.sheppardpratt.org/
- Lists: Hospitals in Maryland

Sheppard Pratt at Ellicott City was a private psychiatric hospital located in Ellicott City, Maryland. It had a 20-bed adult unit, an 18-bed co-occurring disorders unit, an 18-bed crisis stabilization unit, a 22-bed adolescent unit, and an adult day hospital. The hospital was owned and operated by the Towson, Maryland based Sheppard Pratt Health System

Prior to its purchase by Sheppard Pratt the facility was known as Taylor Manor, one of only a dozen privately owned psychiatric facilities in the nation. The hospital closed with the opening of Sheppard Pratt at Elkridge in 2020. Most of the original structures were already demolished prior to the campus closure, as new plans for the Taylor Highlands development were already underway.

== History ==
In 1907 Taylor Manor started as the Howard County Sanitarium Company built on property along College Avenue and New Cut Road in Ellicott City owned by Dr. Rushmore White. The twenty person facility suffered a fire in 1923. In 1939 the facility was purchased by Issac H. Taylor and renamed Patapsco Manor and later renamed as the Pinel Clinic (after the French psychiatrist who took the chains off the patients in asylums outside Paris). Taylor operated an optometrist business and Taylor's Furniture on Main Street. In 1948 the facility expanded to 48 beds, and in 1968 it expanded to 151 beds. The modern architecture circular rotunda stands out at the center of campus. Operated by Dr. Irving J. Taylor (1919-2014), and later Dr. Bruce T. Taylor in 1979, who served as medical director and chief executive officer, Taylor Manor covered more than 65 acres (26 ha) in Ellicott City Maryland. The Ayrd library is named after Taylor Manor Hospital Psychiatric Award winner Frank J. Ayd, MD. In 1953 Dr. Irving Taylor and Taylor Manor Hospital was the first hospital in the country to offer the first psychiatric specific medication, an anti-psychotic medication, Thorazine (chlorpromazine). Other treatments firsts in the area included offering many of the antidepressant and antianxiety drugs as they were developed in the mid-1950s, a dual diagnosis program for treatment of addictions and psychiatric illnesses, a compulsive gambling treatment program, the first specialized treatment programs for adolescents and later for young adults, as well a unique crisis and respite program for adolescents.

The area next to the campus property has been expanded and subdivided by the Taylor family as Taylor Village where sections were sold for housing. The campus acreage totaled 55 acres (22 ha) in 2000. By 2000, Taylor Manor had an operating loss of $1.1 million a year on $15.8 million in revenues. In 2001 Taylor manor's programs were absorbed into the 1500 employee Sheppard Pratt system.

Taylor Manor Hospital provided buildings on campus for several community and mental health services, including: Halfway Home group home from 2003-2018 for addictions, Our House for young men, Maryland Alternative Care for children, and in 2006 Grassroots crisis intervention center operated a 33-bed homeless shelter on the campus while expanding their facilities at Atholton High School.

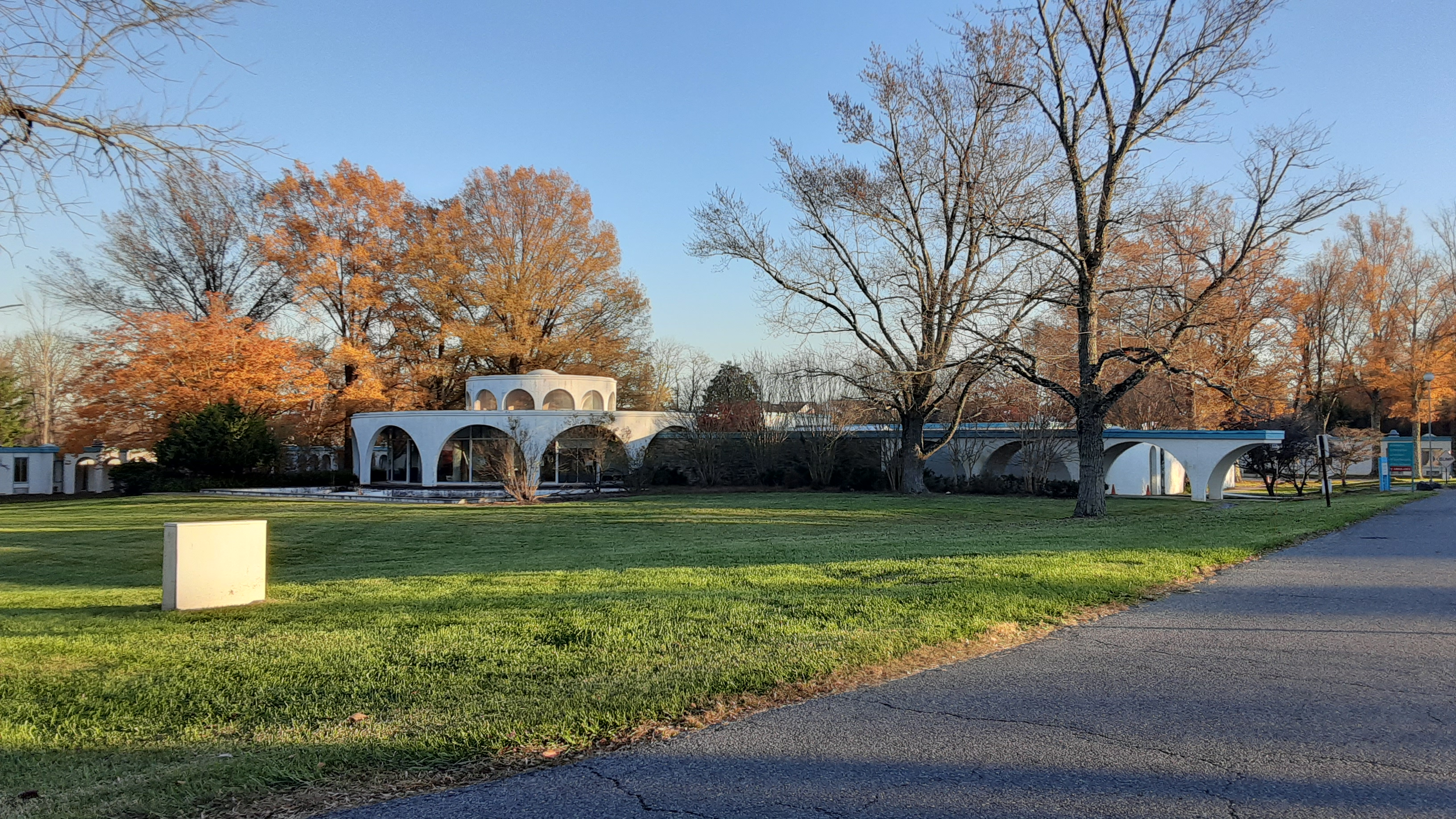
New Center

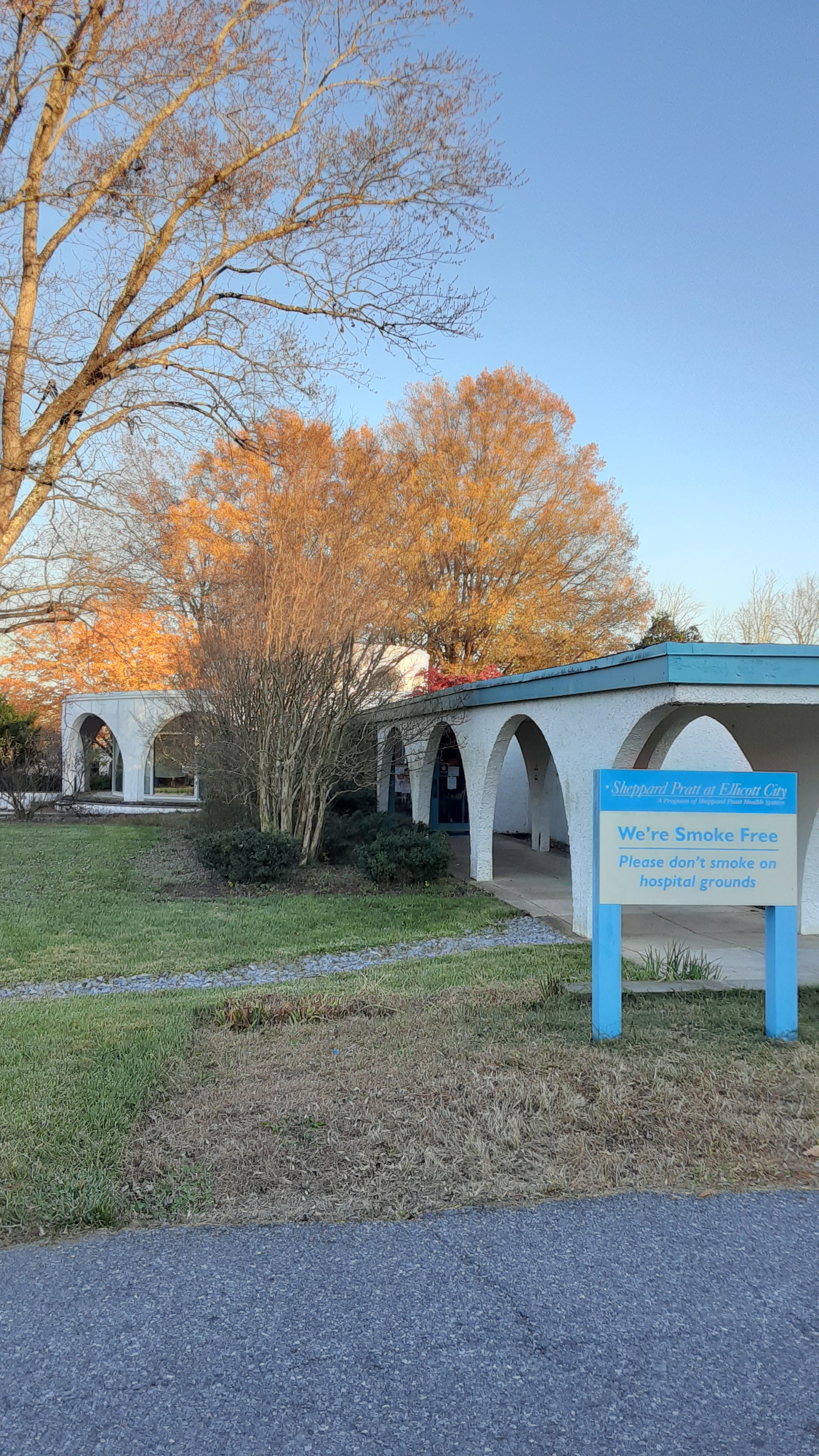
Walkway of the New Center

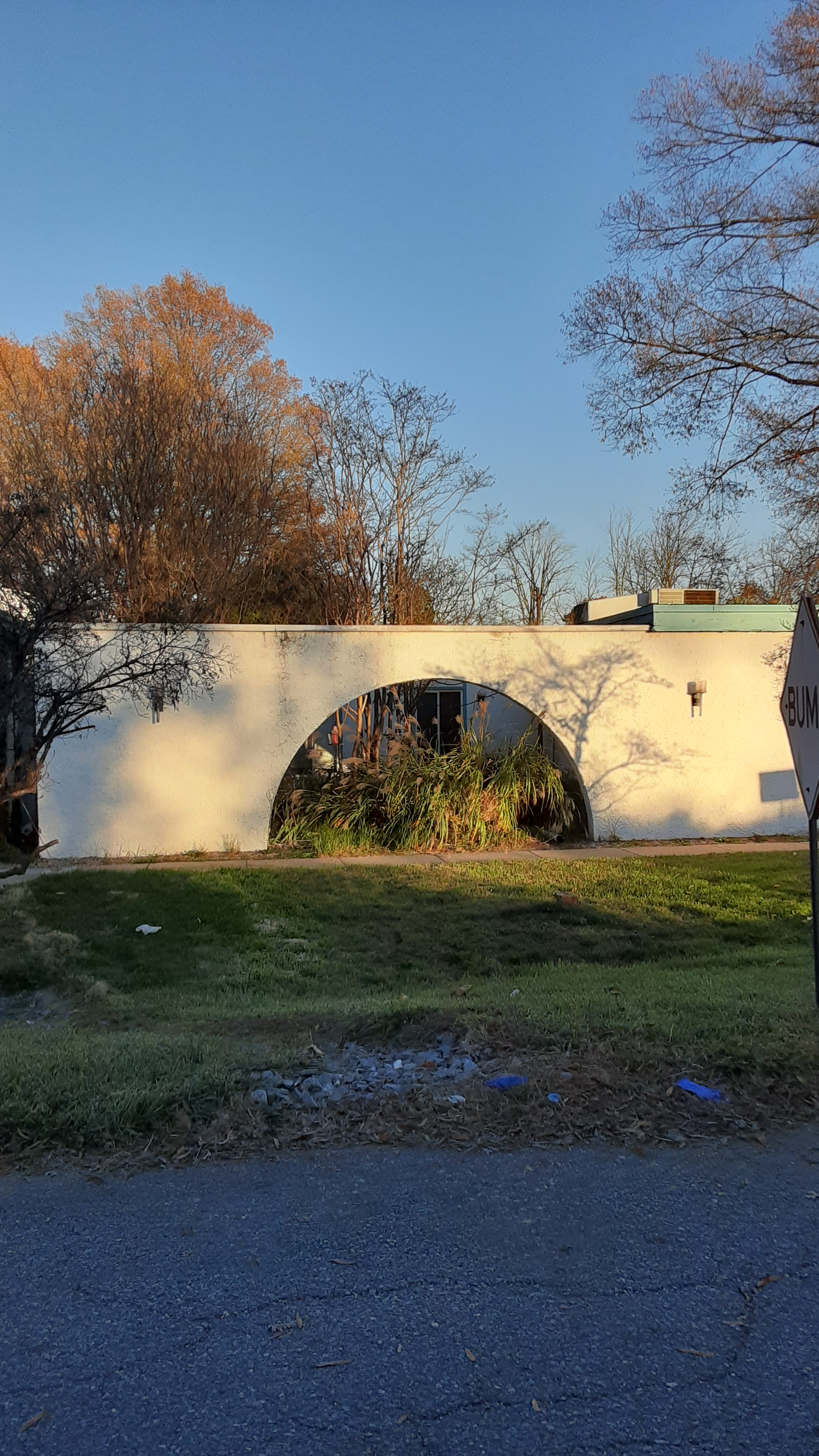
Archway and courtyard

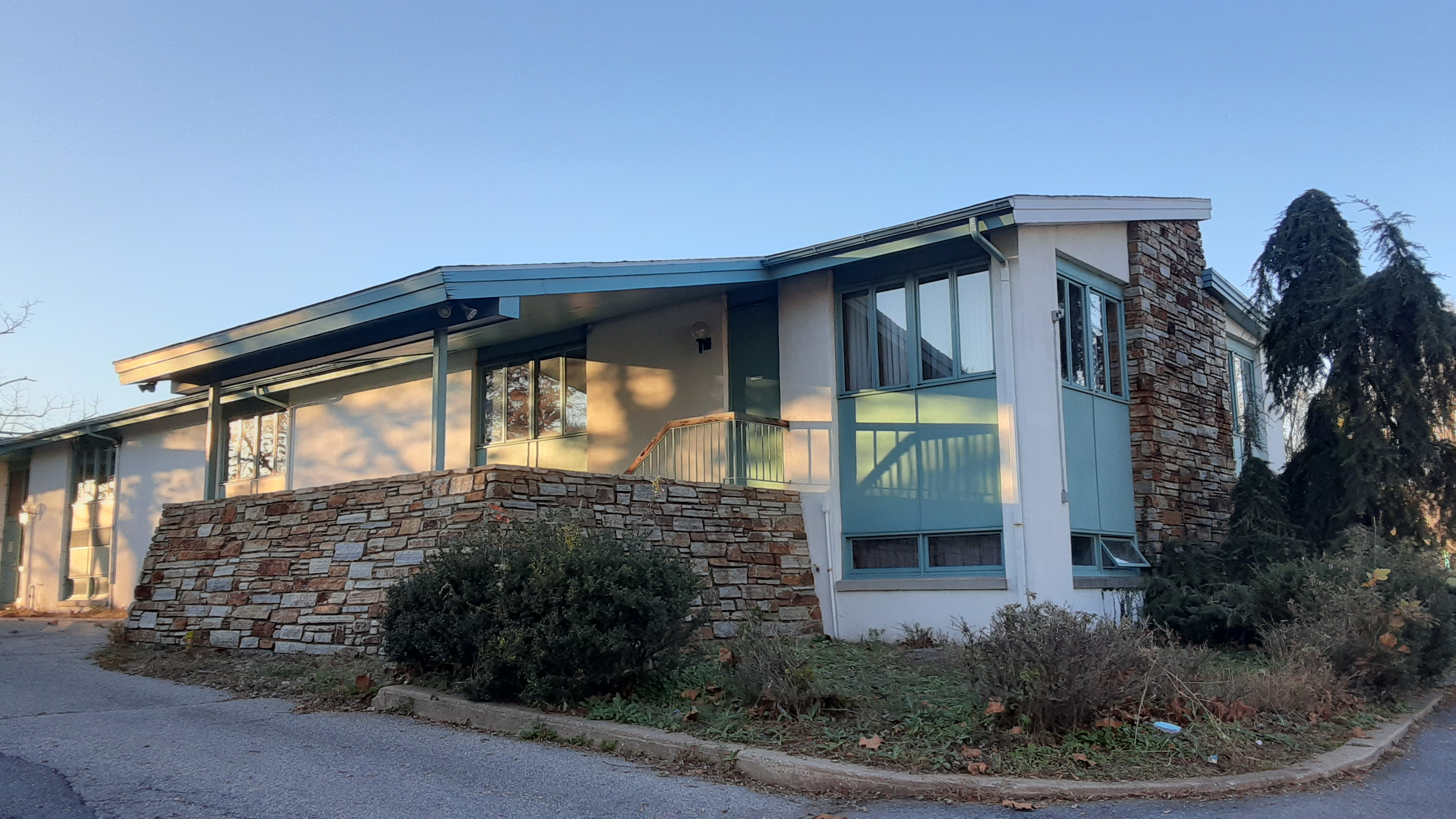
Office Building

=== "Firsts" at Taylor Manor ===
In 1966, Taylor Manor started the first psychiatric treatment program in Maryland for adolescents. Dr. Irving Taylor collaborated with on-site research into the drug Thorazine becoming the first to use anti-psychotic medicine on patients. In 1983 Robert L Custer took gambling research from Ohio to Taylor Manor to create a gambling addiction treatment center . He summarized that gambling addicts had a fear of dying and included a treatment plan that included repaying gambling debts.

=== Significant events ===
Date	Event
1851	Moses Sheppard founds the first Asylum funded by the State of Maryland. The Sheppard Asylum opens in 1891.
1907	The 12 bed Patapsco Manor Sanirium is built.
1939	Patapsco Manor is purchased from Dr. Rushmore White and managed by Ellicott City shop owner Isaac H. Taylor. The facility is renamed the Pinel Clinic.
1941	Pinel Clinic opens a disturbed ward building and occupational therapy shop.
1948	A Four story 24,000 sq ft facility is built on campus. Expanding capacity to 48 beds.
1949	Dr. Irving Taylor becomes medical director and his wife Edith Lee Goodman becomes executive director.
1954	Hospital renamed Taylor Manor
1968	The New Center opens with 151 beds.
1978	Isaac H. Taylor dies
1969	Dr. Irving Taylor starts mental health symposiums continuing for over 25 years.
1982	Changing Point Treatment Center opens
1991	Taylor manor opens an 8- to 22-month program for clergy members in need of support.
1997	Behavioral Health Management Association (BHMA) petitions to run a 26-bed hospital for juvenile sex offenders.
2000	Taylor Manor serves 1,544 inpatients and 4,522 outpatient visits.
2001	Taylor Manor offers campus property to build a school in Ellicott City.
2002	Sheppard Pratt starts operations at Taylor Manor.

== Areas of concentration ==
- Adult Psychiatry
- Child and adolescent psychiatry

=== Notable staff ===
- Frank J. Ayd – Pioneer in psychopharmacotherapy.

=== Notable patients ===
- Ron Franklin (jockey)

== See also ==
- The Sheppard and Enoch Pratt Hospital
- Chestnut Lodge Rockville Maryland.
