= Mt. Washington Pediatric Hospital =

Coordinates: 39.36181°N 76.65436°W

- Johns Hopkins Medical System; University of Maryland Medical System

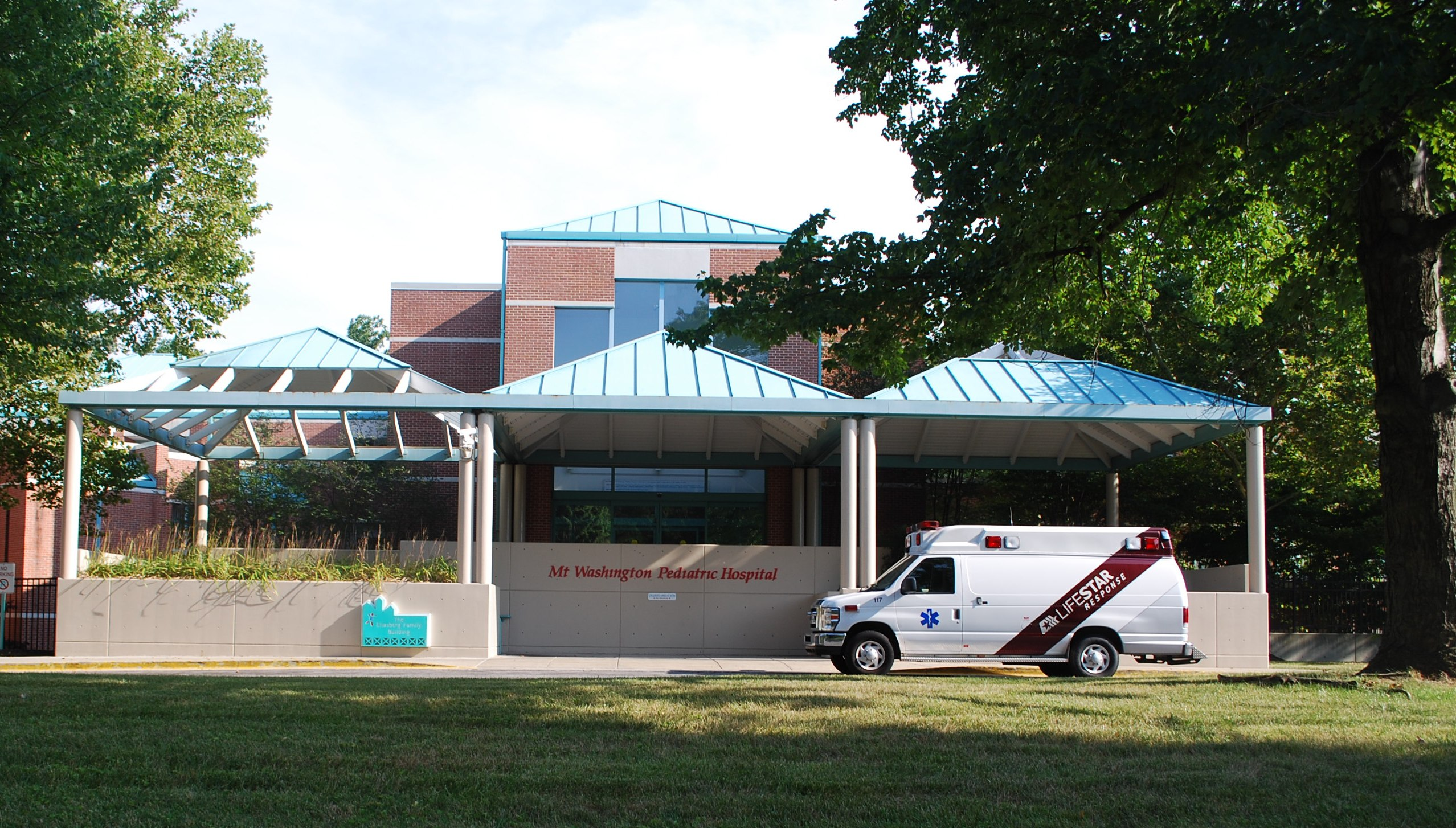
- Front entrance at Mt. Washington Pediatric Hospital

Geography
- Location: Baltimore, Maryland, United States

Organization
- Care system: Private, non-profit

Services
- Emergency department: No
- Beds: 102

History
- Founded: 1922

Links
- Website: www.mwph.org
- Lists: Hospitals in Maryland

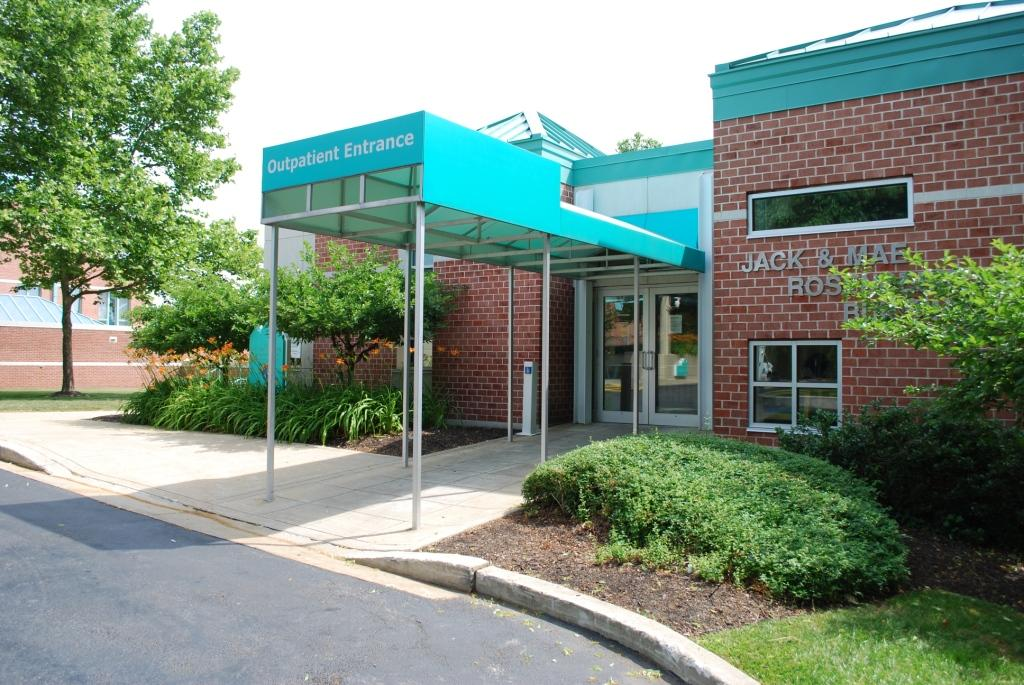
Outpatient entrance at Mt. Washington Pediatric Hospital

Mt. Washington Pediatric Hospital is a United States 102-bed non-profit children's hospital set in the scenic neighborhood of Mt. Washington in Baltimore, Maryland, that provides long-term care for children with complex health problems. MWPH is jointly owned by Johns Hopkins Medical System and University of Maryland Medical System. Funded by patient revenue and private charitable donations, Mt. Washington Pediatric Hospital is a comprehensive sub-acute care facility for children from birth to young adult; MWPH provides transitional and support care for a variety of conditions, including premature birth, serious and chronic illness, traumatic injury, ADHD, autism spectrum disorder, cerebral palsy, childhood obesity, diabetes, feeding problems, among others. Mt. Washington Pediatric Hospital also has a unit at Prince George's Hospital Center in Cheverly, Maryland. MWPH accreditations include Commission on Accreditation of Rehabilitation Facilities and The Joint Commission.

== History ==
In 1922, Johns Hopkins social worker Hortense Kahn Eliasberg founded Happy Hills Convalescent Home at a home off Falls Road. On July 10, 1922, Happy Hills welcomed its first patient. During The Great Depression, Happy Hills appealed for state aid. The depressed economy left a large amount of real estate available, so trustees purchased The Whitelock Estate on West Rogers Avenue in Mt. Washington where the hospital sits today. On October 22, 1930, Happy Hills Home for Convalescent Children was dedicated. Dr. Wilfred H. Smith, Director of Johns Hopkins Hospital, wrote to trustees: “Happy Hills has met a real need in Baltimore. I congratulate you on your success and upon the increase in your facilities. I prophesy that the future will demand of you still further expansion.”

In the 1940s, the work load at the hospital placed further demands on staff, particularly nurses, who influence trustees to hire the first volunteer coordinator. Happy Hills celebrated its 20th anniversary in 1942. In that year, more than 2,700 children received care. The original founder, Hortense Kahn Eliasberg was honored in a presentation by Union Trust Company for her efforts and contribution to the health of the children of Baltimore. Richard F. Cleveland, the eldest son of the late U.S. President Grover Cleveland and last original founding member becomes Board President in 1952.

With the prevalence of polio, Mt. Washington cared for many patients admitted with the devastating disease. Happy Hills answered the patients’ needs with specialty areas of medicine, therapy, nutrition, education, and recreation. Improved technology meant the addition of electrocardiograms, x-rays and laboratories.

Happy Hills celebrated its 40th anniversary in 1964, having provided care for over 6,000 children. The Baltimore Sun noted “its likeness to a special pediatric hospital rather than a convalescent home.” In 1964 Happy Hills also began the journey to its name today. Starting with the changing of the name to Happy Hills Hospital in 1964, then in 1975 to Mt. Washington Pediatric Hospital.

Mt. Washington Pediatric Hospital gained certification from The Joint Commission in 1979. Shortly after Joint Commission certification, the hospital received accreditation from Commission on Accreditation of Rehabilitation Facilities(CARF). Mt. Washington Pediatric Hospital became the first children's hospital in Maryland accredited for comprehensive inpatient rehab, infant and early childhood development and respite care.

On September 26, 1986, groundbreaking began for the new, expanded hospital. A few years later on September 15, 1989, Mayor Kurt Schmoke declared it “Mt. Washington Pediatric Hospital Day” in Baltimore. The Outpatient Care Center opened in November 1990, providing a variety of outpatient services including orthopedic, adaptive equipment, and Down syndrome clinics.

In 1996, the hospital opened its sleep clinic which continues today, assisting with the diagnoses of a variety of pediatric issues. In 1997, a new unit opened at Prince George's Hospital Center. In 2000, the new outpatient center opened and was called the Jack & Mae Rosenberg Center for Pediatric Respiratory Medicine. Outpatient and Day Feeding Programs began to assist with feeding disorders in 2001.

In 2005, the innovative Weigh Smart® program was added as a multi-disciplinary and holistic approach to pediatric weight management. It was followed in (2009) by Weigh Smart Jr. ® designed for weight management of toddlers and preschool-aged children and also involving medical, nutritional, educational and behavioral components. In 2006, MWPH entered into a unique joint ownership with University of Maryland Medical System and Johns Hopkins Medicine. The Center for Pediatric & Adolescent Rehabilitation (CPAR) renovations were completed. It included a colorful Baltimore street theme, flat screen TVs, mobile computers, a new play area and transitional apartment for families. In addition to the CPAR renovations, a modern and larger rehab pool was installed in the Rehabilitation wing. In 2010, the Concussion Clinic opened, along with the Balance Clinic, including the new state-of-the-art NeuroCom® equipment. In addition, the Community Advocacy program began with the goal of reaching out to more residents of the Baltimore community to increase awareness of current health issues important to families.

In 2011, MWPH was recognized as one of 217 hospitals in the United States receiving Stage 6 HIMMS designation for its use of electronic medical records.

== Programs operated ==
The hospital has been recognized for establishing one of the first programs in the region addressing childhood obesity.

Other programs include:

- Asthma/Respiratory Diseases
- Balance Clinic
- Center for Neonatal Transitional Care (CNTC)
- Concussion Assessment & Management Program (CAMP)
- Developmental Evaluation Clinic
- Diabetes Clinic
- Endocrine Clinic
- Gastroenterology
- Infusion Service
- Lead Treatment Program
- Neurodevelopmental Services
- Neuropsychology/Psychology
- Orthopaedics
- Pediatric Chronic Illness Program
- Audiology Services
- Feeding Day Program & Nutrition Services
- Occupational & Physical Therapy
- Physiatry
- Speech and Language
- Sports Injuries
- Psychiatry
- Pulmonary Clinic
- Rehabilitation Day Hospital
- Sleep Testing and Evaluation
- Videofluoroscopy Swallow Studies
- Center for Pediatric Weight Management and Healthy Living
- Weigh Smart®/ Weigh Smart® Jr.
- Adolescent Bariatric Surgery Evaluation and Management
