= Walter P Carter Center =

- State of Maryland

Geography
- Location: Baltimore, Maryland, United States
- Coordinates: 39°17′25″N 76°37′32″W

Organization
- Type: Specialist

Services
- Speciality: Psychiatric hospital

History
- Opened: 1976
- Closed: October 1, 2009

Links
- Lists: Hospitals in Maryland

The Walter P. Carter Center was a psychiatric hospital in Baltimore, Maryland.

It was founded in 1976 and ceased operating as a hospital on October 1, 2009. The facility was named in memory of the Baltimore civil rights leader, Walter P. Carter and it was considered to be a national model of community-based psychiatric treatment when it opened. At one time the center provided both inpatient and outpatient psychiatric services to adults and adolescents. It also ran an urgent care psychiatric evaluation walk-in department and a brief-stay emergency treatment unit. Other services that were offered at the Carter Center were outpatient chemical dependency treatment and residential services for the intellectually disabled.

The Carter Center was operated by the State of Maryland.

The Walter P. Carter Center is now an outpatient facility that is part of the University of Maryland Medical System. Located at 701 West Pratt Street in Baltimore, it offers outpatient mental health and addiction services in one location to all ages, including children, adults and the elderly.
