= Pine Bluff State Hospital =

- State of Maryland Department of Health and Mental Hygiene
- Location within Maryland

Geography
- Location: 1500 - 1514 Riverside Drive, Salisbury, Maryland, United States
- Coordinates: 38.343297°N 75.624885°W

Organization
- Type: Specialist

Services
- Beds: 65
- Specialty: Tuberculosis Sanatorium

History
- Founded: 1912
- Closed: 1977

Links
- Lists: Hospitals in Maryland

Pine Bluff State Hospital was a tuberculosis sanatorium and isolation hospital in Salisbury, Maryland, in the United States. The hospital was built by The Pine Bluff Sanatorium Company. The hospital grounds contain three parcels, the first is 0.46 acres (0.19 ha), the second is 1.534 acres (0.621 ha), and the third 8.35 acres (3.38 ha).

== History ==
When the hospital opened in 1912, it was a private institution managed by the Superintendent Edward Peyton Ritchings, M.D.. A portion of the construction was funded by the state legislature in fiscal year 1912 and 1913 in the amount of $15,000 for the building, $5,000 for additions, and $5,000 for maintenance. It contained outside shacks for the use of colored patients.

In 1923, the hospital constructed new buildings as a tuberculosis sanatorium under the direction and contributions of Dr. George W. Todd. The hospital became the second state owned health facility on the Eastern Shore in 1925. The hospital provided care for 65 patients with 43 staff members.

After the hospital ended being a tuberculosis sanatorium in 1972, it became an annex to Deer's Head Hospital. A few years later, in 1975, Senator Homer White, working with the MAC program, conducted a study to convert the buildings into an elderly care center. The plan was approved in 1977 with the buildings being converted to their present format.

In 2012, the buildings were evaluated, but not listed as historic, by the Maryland Historical Trust.

== Current use ==
When the hospital was closed in 1977, the large parcel of 8.35 acres, where the hospital was located, was leased to Pine Bluff Associates on the ground rent system from the State of Maryland. The buildings were converted into an elderly care center and retirement apartment complex. The property was later sold to Pine Bluff Associates in 2012 and then Pine Bluff Estates, LLC in 2014.

The smallest parcel has been vacant since 2011. It contains an office building built in 1935. It was leased for years by the local nonprofit, MAC, Inc., an agency to maintain active citizens. In 2014 it was sold by the State to Pine Bluff Estates, LLC.
