= Eastern Shore Hospital Center =

- State of Maryland

Geography
- Location: Cambridge, Maryland, United States

Organization
- Type: Specialist

Services
- Beds: 76
- Speciality: Psychiatric

History
- Founded: 1912

Links
- Website: http://dhmh.maryland.gov/eshc/
- Lists: Hospitals in Maryland

The Eastern Shore Hospital Center is a 76-bed psychiatric facility that is located in Cambridge, Maryland. It is owned and operated by the State of Maryland, under the Maryland Department of Health. Levels of care provided include acute and long-term inpatient psychiatric hospital services for adults aged 18 and older. The center also operates an on-site 16-bed residential Assisted Living Program that is known as Stepping Stone at Manokin. The 40-bed Upper Shore Community Mental Health Center, a psychiatric hospital that was located in Chestertown, and the Eastern Shore Hospital Center were jointly administered for a number of years. The Upper Shore Community Mental Health Center was closed in March 2010.

== History ==
The Eastern Shore State Hospital (ESSH) was initially established in 1912, and was originally located on the banks of the Choptank River. During the 1970s it was renamed as the Eastern Shore Hospital Center (ESHC). The hospital has been fully accredited since May 1967.

Due to the consideration for public economic development at the hospital site along the Choptank River during the mid-1990s, the hospital was moved to its current location - where a new facility was constructed.
