= University of Maryland St. Joseph Medical Center =

- University of Maryland Medical System

Geography
- Location: 7601 Osler Drive, Towson, Maryland, U.S.
- Coordinates: 39°23′16″N 76°36′41″W

Organisation
- Care system: Private not-for-profit

Services
- Emergency department: Yes
- Beds: 224

History
- Opened: 1864

Links
- Website: http://www.StJosephTowson.com/
- Lists: Hospitals in U.S.

University of Maryland St. Joseph Medical Center is a 300-bed regional medical center in Towson, Maryland formerly operated by Catholic Health Initiatives. On December 1, 2012, University of Maryland Medical System acquired all the assets of St. Joseph Medical Center from Catholic Health Initiatives and renamed the hospital to University of Maryland St. Joseph Medical Center. An agreement was made between University of Maryland Medical System and the Archdiocese of Baltimore to continue the religious mission and Catholic traditions at University of Maryland St. Joseph Medical Center.

The hospital's history dates to 1864, when Catherine Eberhard donated three Baltimore rowhouses to the Sisters of St. Francis of Philadelphia. Six years later, the state government approved the incorporation of Saint Joseph German Hospital. The hospital moved to a larger Baltimore facility in 1872 and then to Towson in 1965.

Prior to this acquisition, St. Joseph's was experiencing money issues and loss of long-time patients in their cardiology department after their former star cardiologist Mark Midei lost his medical license due to multiple lawsuits filed against him over the issue of heart stents.
