= Northwest Hospital (Randallstown, Maryland) =

- LifeBridge Health

Geography
- Location: 5401 Old Court Road, Randallstown, Maryland, United States
- Coordinates: 39°21′32″N 76°46′53″W

Organization
- Care system: Private non-profit

Services
- Emergency department: Yes
- Beds: 202

History
- Opened: 1963, then called Baltimore County General Hospital

Links
- Website: http://www.lifebridgehealth.org/northwest
- Lists: Hospitals in Maryland

Northwest Hospital, formerly known as Northwest Hospital Center and Baltimore County General Hospital before that, is a hospital in Randallstown, Maryland (a suburb of Baltimore) owned and operated by LifeBridge Health. The hospital is full-service, with an emergency department and surgical facilities. It is located at the intersection of Old Court Road and Carlson Lane, south of Liberty Road.

Northwest Hospital has 254 private inpatient beds and offers care for medical, surgical, behavioral health, rehabilitative and hospice patients. Its facilities have been designed around the Friesen concept, with nursing alcoves outside each patient room so nurses can spend more time with their patients. The Friesen-design hospital functions differently from the traditional hospital in that it creates an environment conducive to direct patient care through smaller 20-bed units; elimination of nursing stations; and placing supplies, medications and charts in close proximity to patients.
