= Thomas B. Finan Center =

Geography
- Location: Cumberland, Maryland, United States
- Coordinates: 39°39′24″N 78°44′9″W

Organization
- Type: Specialist

Services
- Beds: 88
- Speciality: psychiatric hospital

History
- Opened: 1979

Links
- Website: www.tbfinancenter.com
- Lists: Hospitals in Maryland

The Thomas B. Finan Center is an inpatient psychiatric hospital located in Cumberland, Maryland. It is owned and managed by the state of Maryland. The CEO is Lesa Diehl.

This state psychiatric facility operates 88 beds.

The Finan Center provides services to persons who are 18 years of age and older. The Center includes patients with criminal histories, non-criminals who have been involuntarily civilly committed and voluntary patients. The Finan Center is accredited by The Joint Commission.

It provides mental health services for adults from Washington, Allegany, Garrett and Frederick counties.

It opened in 1979 and is named for Thomas B. Finan, who was an Attorney General of Maryland.
