= Carroll Hospital =

Hospital in Westminster, Maryland, US

Coordinates: 39°33′30″N 76°59′25″W

Founded in 1961, Carroll Hospital Center is a branch of Lifebridge Health located in Westminster, Maryland. Carroll Hospital offers comprehensive medical care, with specialties including minimally invasive surgery and a state-of-the-art cancer center.

== History ==
Opened on October 1, 1961, Carroll County General Hospital, originally planned by local citizens in 1957, was a hospital with only 50 beds and a total of 125 employees. By the late 1960s, medical needs had increased in the community and the hospital added a North wing and a West wing.

== Expansion and renovations ==
Before 1980, another expansion added three more floors to both wings. The 159-bed facility also housed services such as Physical Therapy. The Emergency Department, X-ray Department, and Laboratory were expanded as well. Carroll County General Hospital was awarded its first two-year accreditation by JCAHO (now Joint Commission) in 1981. Throughout the decade, the hospital upgraded many services, including CT scans, pediatrics, and minimally invasive surgical techniques (arthroscopy, laparoscopy).

In 1995, amidst a very large population growth in Carroll County, the hospital added a Psychiatric unit, Angiography Lab, larger Emergency Department, Sleep Lab, and Oncology. The Family Birthplace opened in 1996 and hosted 20 private suites. It provided patients with labor and delivery services, as well as recovery and post-partum services. The Richard N. Dixon Surgery Center opened in 1997 providing the community with outpatient surgeries—the first facility of its kind in the county. The Women's Place opened in 1999 with a focus on the wellness of women.

The largest expansions occurred during the 2000 millennium. Carroll County General Hospital changed its name to Carroll Hospital in 2003, and, in December of that year, Carroll Hospital Center opened a 30,000 sq ft (2,800 m^{2}). new Emergency Department. By 2004, a South tower was opened, this one was 5 stories tall with 24 privatized rooms for patients on each floor. The original Emergency Department was then renovated for Outpatient Services and opened in 2005 for diabetes, hyperbaric sessions, and wound care treatments. Cardiac Rehab was also moved to Outpatient Services. A renovated Operating Room opened in 2007, along with an inpatient hospice facility named Dove House which houses the Carroll Homecare and Carroll Hospice departments.

During the summer of 2011, Carroll Hospital acquired the Carroll Regional Cancer Center which had previously been owned by U.S. Oncology. In February 2013, construction began on a new wellness center. Upon completion in 2014, The William E. Kahlert Regional Cancer Center and Tevis Center for Wellness will be the new home for the Carroll Regional Cancer Center.

== Merger with Lifebridge Health ==
Carroll Hospital Center announced, on November 6, 2014, that it intended to partner with LifeBridge Health of Baltimore, Maryland. On April 1, 2015 Carroll Hospital officially became a subsidiary of the Life Bridge Health organization, making it the third hospital in the healthcare system.
