= LifeBridge Health =

Nonprofit healthcare corporation

- Type: Non-profit
- Industry: Healthcare
- Founded: October 1, 1998; 27 years ago Baltimore, Maryland, U.S.
- Headquarters: Baltimore, Maryland, U.S.
- Area served: Maryland
- Number of employees: 7,000
- Website: www.lifebridgehealth.org

LifeBridge Health is a nonprofit healthcare corporation that was formed in 1998 and currently operates several medical institutions in and around Baltimore, Maryland. These institutions include Sinai Hospital of Baltimore, Grace Medical Center (Baltimore, MD), Northwest Hospital in Randallstown, Carroll Hospital in Westminster, Levindale Hebrew Geriatric Center and Hospital, a fitness center (LifeBridge Health & Fitness), and affiliated medical office complexes and subsidiaries.

LifeBridge Health employs more than 7,000 people. Its acute care hospitals admit close to 40,000 patients and provide care for approximately 145,000 emergency visits per year combined.

On November 6, 2014, the company announced a signed letter of intent to partner with Carroll Hospital Center in Westminster, Maryland. The acquisition was completed April 1, 2015.

== History ==
LifeBridge Health previous logo

LifeBridge Health was formed on October 1, 1998, through the merger of the Sinai Health System (Sinai Hospital of Baltimore and Levindale Hebrew Geriatric Center and Hospital) and Northwest Hospital Center. On April 1, 2015, Lifebridge acquired Carroll Hospital in Westminster.

== LifeBridge Health Hospitals ==
=== Northwest Hospital ===
Northwest Hospital is a 254-bed, full-service hospital based in Randallstown, Maryland. It was founded in 1963 as the Baltimore County General Hospital and its facilities were designed around the Friesen concept, with nursing alcoves outside each patient room so nurses can spend more time with their patients. More than 700 physicians provide treatment for close to 15,000 patients every year. The hospital includes ambulatory surgery, cardiology, orthopedics, psychiatry, women's wellness and other service lines.

Brian White is president of Northwest Hospital.

=== Sinai Hospital of Baltimore ===
Sinai Hospital is a 504-bed hospital based in Baltimore, Maryland. It was founded in 1866 as the Hebrew Hospital and Asylum and is now a Jewish-sponsored ANCC Magnet and teaching hospital that provides care for patients in Baltimore City, Baltimore County and surrounding communities. More than 1,000 physicians provide treatment for almost 26,000 patients every year. The hospital includes cardiology, emergency medicine, oncology, orthopedics, pediatrics and other service lines.

Dr. Jonathan Ringo is COO of Sinai Hospital.

=== Carroll Hospital of Westminster ===
Members of Carroll County Health Services Corporation, parent company of Carroll Hospital, voted on March 27, 2015, to approve an affiliation agreement with LifeBridge Health to offer new services and expanded care for the people of Carroll County and the greater Baltimore region. On April 1, 2015, Carroll Hospital became a subsidiary of LifeBridge Health.

In order to support the mission of Carroll Hospital and its other charitable affiliates, LifeBridge Health will also make a $50 million contribution to the endowment fund of the Carroll Hospital Foundation. The income generated from the endowment helps to fund patient care, scholarships, community education and other community benefit related programs.

== Other Facilities ==
=== Levindale Hebrew Geriatric Center and Hospital ===
Levindale Hebrew Geriatric Center and Hospital, located on Belvedere Avenue across the street from Sinai Hospital, was founded in 1890 as the Hebrew Friendly Inn. Levindale's 120-bed Specialty Hospital admits more than 1,300 patients every year. The 210-bed Nursing Home provides long-term, subacute and other forms of care for 450 patients every year. Levindale also provides outpatient behavioral care and adult day services.

=== LifeBridge Health & Fitness ===
LifeBridge Health & Fitness is a health and fitness club located in Pikesville, Maryland.

=== Community Physicians ===
LifeBridge Health primary and specialty care physicians are located at medical offices throughout the state of Maryland.

=== Baltimore Child Abuse Center ===
The Baltimore Child Abuse Center became a wholly owned subsidiary of LifeBridge Health on January 1, 2019.
