= University of Maryland Medical System =

Not-for-profit corporation based in Baltimore, Maryland

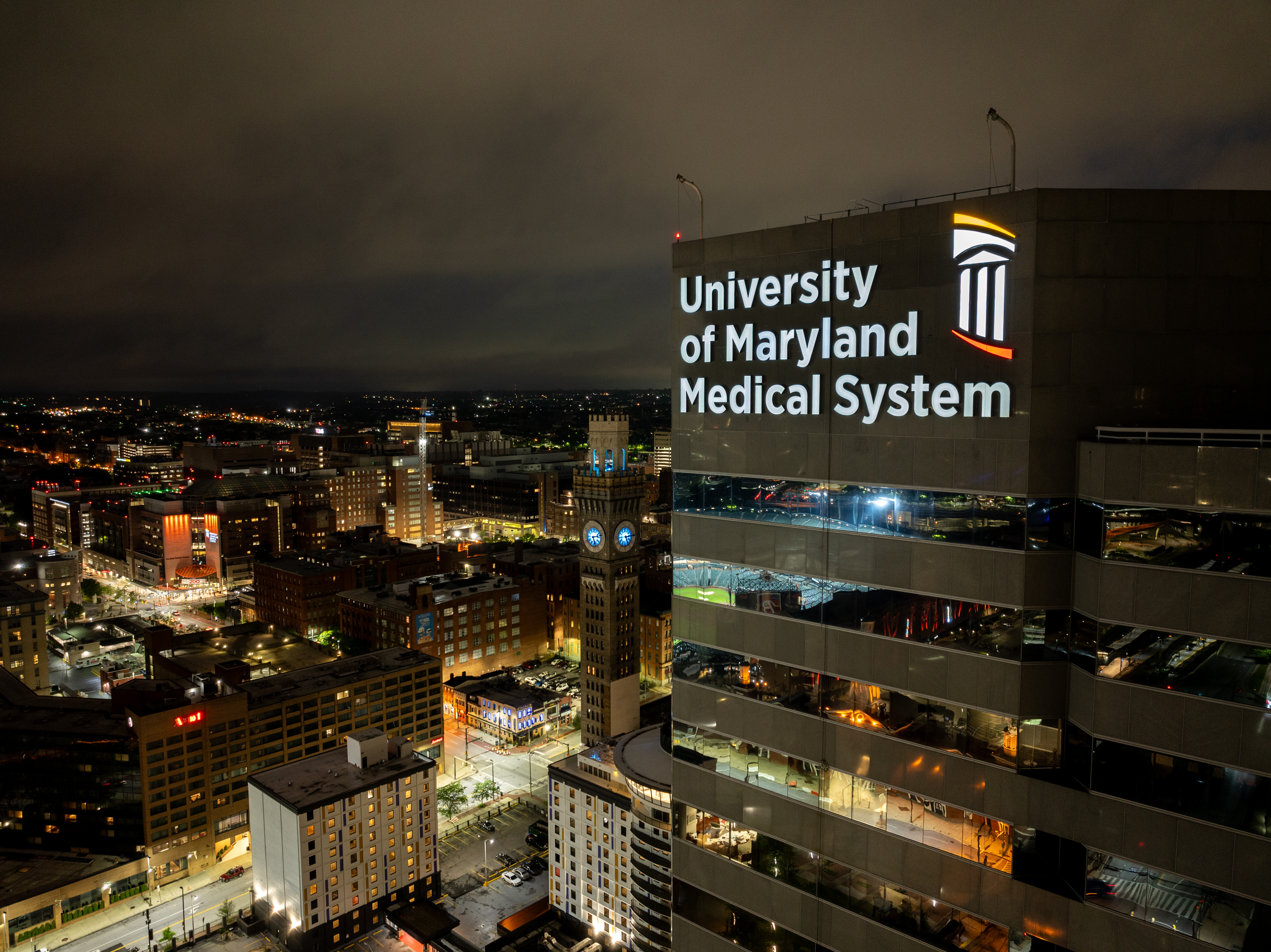
- University of Maryland Medical System in Downtown Baltimore
- Type: Not-for-profit
- Industry: Healthcare
- Founded: 1984; 42 years ago
- Headquarters: Baltimore, Maryland, U.S.
- Area served: Maryland, Mid-Atlantic region
- Key people: Dr. Mohan Suntha (President and CEO)
- Services: Healthcare, Medical Research, Medical training
- Revenue: US$4.86 billion (2022)
- Total assets: 5,321,652,043 United States dollar (2022)
- Number of employees: 29,000
- Website: www.umms.org

The University of Maryland Medical System (UMMS) is a private, not-for-profit corporation founded in 1984 and based in Baltimore, Maryland. As of 2023, it owns and operates 11 hospitals in Maryland, 4 free-standing emergency rooms and over 150 care locations, including a network of urgent care centers. UMMS has more than 2,400 licensed beds, 100,000 annual admissions and gross patient revenues of $4.86 billion annually. UMMS medical staff work with University of Maryland School of Medicine specialists to provide primary and specialty care across the state.

== History ==
In 1823, the University of Maryland Medical System originated as the Baltimore Infirmary formed by the faculty of the University of Maryland School of Medicine. The Infirmary became the University of Maryland Hospital in 1897. Formerly a State institution, University Hospital, in 1984 affiliated with the newly created University of Maryland Medical System (UMMS). The System was established by the Maryland General Assembly in 1984 as a private, nonprofit corporation (Chapter 288, Acts of 1984). It reformed as the University of Maryland Medical System Corporation in 1996.

Major components of UMMS include:

=== UMMS Hospitals ===
University of Maryland Medical System (Maryland)
- University of Maryland Medical Center
- University of Maryland Medical Center Midtown Campus
- University of Maryland Baltimore Washington Medical Center
- University of Maryland Capital Region Medical Center
- University of Maryland Charles Regional Medical Center
- University of Maryland Laurel Medical Center
- University of Maryland Rehabilitation & Orthopaedic Institute
- University of Maryland St. Joseph Medical Center
- University of Maryland Shore Emergency Center at Queenstown
- University of Maryland Shore Medical Center at Cambridge
- University of Maryland Shore Medical Center at Chestertown
- University of Maryland Shore Medical Center at Easton
- University of Maryland Upper Chesapeake Medical Center Bel Air
- University of Maryland Upper Chesapeake Medical Center Aberdeen
- Mt. Washington Pediatric Hospital

==== R Adams Cowley Shock Trauma Center ====
The R Adams Cowley Shock Trauma Center (also known as Shock Trauma) is the world's first center dedicated to saving lives of people with severe, life-threatening injuries sustained in motor vehicle collisions, violent crimes and other traumatic incidents.

Shock Trauma has more than 100 inpatient beds dedicated to emergency surgery, resuscitation, intensive care, and acute surgical care. The trauma staff treat more than 7,500 critically injured patients each year who arrive by helicopter or ambulance.

It is named after its founder, R Adams Cowley, M.D., who came up with the concept of the "golden hour" — that lives can be saved when trauma patients receive appropriate care within one hour of their injury. Shock Trauma trains physicians and medical personnel from locations overseas and throughout the United States.

==== Greenebaum Comprehensive Cancer Center ====
The University of Maryland Greenebaum Comprehensive Cancer Center (UMGCCC) is designated by the National Cancer Institute as one of the top cancer centers in the country UMGCCC is known for providing coordinated care from teams of specialists—medical oncologists, radiation oncologists, surgical oncologists, pathologists, nurses and other team members who have expertise in particular types of cancer—who consult on each patient's case and develop a joint treatment plan.

UMGCCC also is known as a center with expertise in laboratory and clinical research. UMGCCC researchers actively participate in new drug development, and the center offers more than 100 clinical trials.

In 2024, UMGCCC was named one of the best hospitals for cancer care by U.S. News and World Report.

==== University of Maryland Children's Hospital ====
With 16 locations across Maryland, the University of Maryland Children's Hospital (UMCH) provides care for serious and complex health problems in infants, children, teens, and young adults aged 0–21 and sometimes up until 25 throughout Maryland. UMCH has its own pediatric pharmacy and emergency room, and is also very active in children's health care research.

In 2024, UMCH was named “Best Children's Hospital For Neonatology” by U.S. News and World Report.

== Successful cases ==
In January 2022, researchers and clinicians at UMMS's flagship hospital successfully transplanted a genetically modified pig heart into a 57-year-old man, David Bennett Sr., for the first time in history.

In 2019, UMMS was the first in the world to use of a drone/unmanned aircraft to carry an organ for transplantation.

== Healthy Holly Controversy ==
In 2019, Baltimore Mayor Catherine Pugh became the center of a controversy related to a payment of $500,000 from UMMS for the purchase of her Healthy Holly self-published books. This no-bid payment was controversial because the years of payments coincided with her tenure as head of a health committee in the Maryland State Senate and as mayor of Baltimore. Mayor Pugh also served on the Board of Directors of UMMS. She did not disclose the payments or recuse herself from votes and decisions involving the medical system and the wider Healthy Holly Controversy led to her resignation and eventual criminal conviction.

Maryland legislative leaders and UMMS pledged to reform the practice of giving large contracts to board of directors due to the conflict it poses to their decision-making. By January 2020, UMMS had replaced almost all members of its Board of Directors and its senior executives, appointing Dr. Mohan Suntha as its new President and Chief Executive officer.
