= Albert Kurland =

American neuropsychopharmacologist (1914–2008)

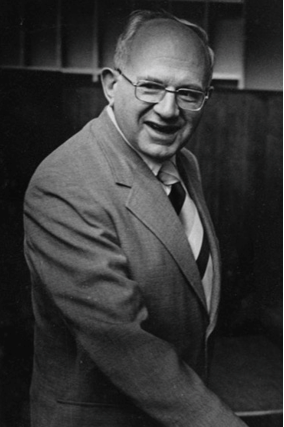
- Albert Kurland in the 1970s
- Born: June 29, 1914; Edwardsville, Pennsylvania, U.S
- Died: December 7, 2008 (aged 94); North Oaks Retirement Community, Pikesville, Maryland, U.S
- Citizenship: American
- Education: Baltimore City College; University of Maryland Medical School; Sinai Hospital
- Known for: Maryland Psychiatric Research Center, Antipsychotics, Psychedelics, Antidepressants
- Children: 2
- Awards: Legion of Merit
- Scientific career
- Fields: Psychiatry, Neuropsychopharmacology
- Institutions: Spring Grove State Hospital; Maryland Psychiatric Research Center; Taylor Manor Hospital; Johns Hopkins University

Albert Kurland (June 29, 1914 – December 7, 2008) was a psychiatrist and neuropsychopharmacologist at the Spring Grove State Hospital and the Maryland State Psychiatric Research Center. He was also affiliated with Johns Hopkins University as a research professor. He was a prolific researcher, conducting many studies on anti-psychotics, completing early research on the treatment of alcoholics using psychedelics, and making integral contributions to the research unit at the Spring Grove State Hospital.

== Early life ==
Kurland was born June 29, 1914, in Edwardsville, Luzerne County, Pennsylvania to parents who had emigrated from the border region of Poland and Belarus. He moved to Baltimore and lived with other relatives as a teenager, completing his diploma at City College Baltimore in 1932.

Kurland completed his medical degree at the University of Maryland Medical School in 1940 and afterwards served as an assistant battalion surgeon under General Patton in World War II. Under Patton, Kurland encountered gruesome physical and psychological suffering among soldiers. He received a Legion of Merit medal for his valor.

Kurland explained that his combat experiences motivated him to engage in neuropsychiatric medicine:

Well, I saw in combat an awful lot of stress. I saw a lot of stress reactions. I saw troops killed by friendly fire, and then the troopers shoot themselves. I saw all kinds of dreadful things….[So] I'd like to go to a neuropsychiatric unit if possible to learn something about this situation, and maybe, I might be able to find ways and means of being helpful in this areas.

== Post-war developments ==
Kurland received neuropsychiatric training at Mason General Hospital and then received a Fellowship in Neuropsychiatric Research at Sinai Hospital in East Baltimore while also working part-time at the Veterans' Administration.

Following these positions, Kurland arrived at Spring Grove State Hospital in 1946. At this time the hospital had roughly 2,700 patients and 23 psychiatrists. The physician-patient ratio was not conducive one on one doctor:patient consultations, and this motivated Kurland to explore new methods of treatment. In his spare time and without funding from Spring Grove, he began to explore the use of Thorazine (chlorpromazine) in psychiatric experiments.

By the mid-1950s, Kurland's efforts were recognized by Charles Savage and Lou Cholden at the National Institute for Mental Health (NIMH).

With his research opportunities increasing, Kurland founded Friends of Psychiatric Research to coordinate additional funding for, and to simplify the administration of, his research. Soon afterwards he was promoted to Director of Research at Spring Grove in 1953. He also received increasing support from Gene Brody at the University of Maryland and Joel Elkes at Johns Hopkins University at about this time. With additional funding from the state of Maryland, Kurland and his colleagues launched the Maryland Psychiatric Research Center. As he conducted his research, Kurland founded the Maryland Psychiatric Research Center, of which he was the first director. The center was built with $1.5 million of funding from state of Maryland in 1967.

Ten years after his appointment to the Maryland Psychiatric Research Center, Kurland was appointed to Research Associate in Psychiatry at the University of Maryland Medical School, in January 1977. The Center continues to operate today with eight active research programs, including neuroscience, neuroimaging research, and the Maryland Brain Collection program. Kurland also served as a research professor at Johns Hopkins University.

Near the end of his career, Kurland suggested that developments in psychotropic drugs alone were not sufficient to help individuals grow to their full capacity:

There's much to be done but I think it will be done in the future, because we know the limitations of the drugs we're using today. We treat a panic disorder, we treat alcoholism, we treat depression, and we ameliorate the symptoms, but what are we doing so far that is adding to the individual's capacity for development?

Kurland's concern for the "individual's capacity for development" can be placed alongside the description that Kurland, "never said an unkind word about anyone."

== Contributions to neuropsychopharmocology ==
Kurland published over 150 studies in the fields of psychiatry, in particular, neuropsychopharmacology. The figure shown at right presents the frequency of Kurland's published research by different treatment modalities.

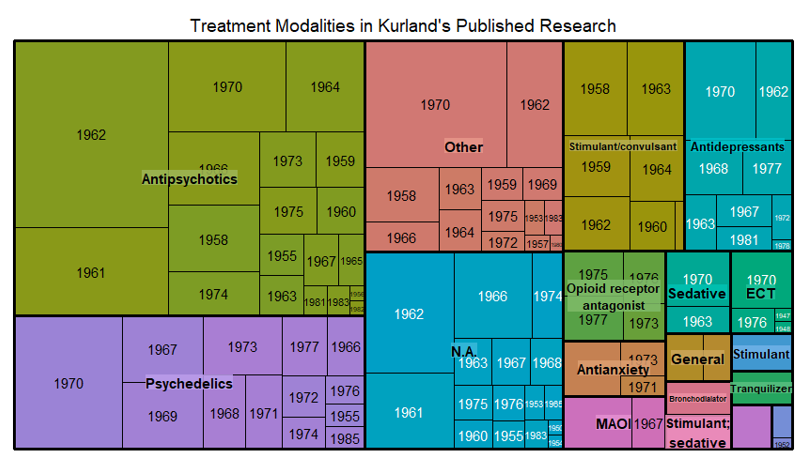
Treemap of the frequency of Kurland's published articles.

=== Research on LSD as a Treatment ===
With Cholden and Savage, Kurland published his first peer-reviewed research on psychedelics in 1955. Entitled "Clinical reactions and tolerance to LSD in chronic schizophrenia," the study sought to ascertain reactions to LSD among "chronic, regressed, schizophrenic patients" so that results could be compared to earlier research that described reactions of LSD among other subjects. This information was preliminary to the study's second aim, which was to examine the clinical and therapeutic potential of LSD. The research team also sought to replicate research conducted by Abram Hoffer and Humphrey Osmond who had done earlier LSD research in Canada beginning in 1952.

Kurland's work with Cholden and Savage predated their efforts in the subsequent Spring Grove experiment.

Unlike previous research on LSD, Kurland and his peers administered LSD intramuscularly, providing better control of dosing patients who often did not swallow oral doses completely. The team also took steps to allow patients to adjust to new research settings such that any reactions to LSD would be independent of reactions associated with environmental change.

Kurland and his colleagues found that reactions to LSD in the regressed schizophrenic subjects had at least three types: (1) covert reactions, in which no striking behavioral change was observed (e.g. patients became withdrawn), (2) intensified reactions, in which subjects presented increased agitation, anxiety or delusion and (3) reversed reactions, in which behaviors changed dramatically from what was typical (e.g. hostile patients became friendly). This research also found that tolerance to LSD was not entirely psychological in nature because cross-tolerance with brom-lysergic acid was present while cross-tolerance with mescaline was negative. Finally, the team provided observations of how much time was required before larger doses of LSD were necessary to have the same impact as an initial dose.

Kurland's research at Spring Grove was not unique. According to Dyck's analysis, there were at least 100 articles on LSD by 1951, over 500 by the end of the 1950s, and ten years later there were more than 1000. However, Kurland and his team developed a research program that was the most ambitious and longstanding of its kind. According to one of Kurland's subsequent co-authors:

The body of research that emerged from these 23 years of study [at Spring Grove] remains the largest, most sustained and systematic research into therapeutic use of psychedelic drugs and psychotherapy yet attempted.

Kurland's 1955 research on LSD paused until the 1960s when Sanford Unger arrived at Spring Grove. Unger was a psychologist from Hollywood Hospital in Vancouver, British Columbia. By 1963, Kurland was collaborating with Unger and Charles Savage in renewed research, examining the efficacy of LSD in treating alcoholics and subsequently cancer patients.

Kurland's continued research on LSD in the 1960s and 1970s was complicated by the "moral panic" the general population had about the drug as well as by increased regulations for medical research. Additionally, LSD research posed methodological complications in observing the drug's effects on treatment and control groups. While the standard in medical research was a double-blind study, the effects of LSD were obvious to investigators. For these reasons, LSD research waned by the late 1970s. Today, however, research on the efficacy of psychedelics continues.

=== Research on antipsychotic compounds ===
Kurland published with various colleagues nearly 50 studies on antipsychotics, beginning with his study of chlorpromazine (Thorazine) in 1955. Chlorpromazine had been shown to have useful applications by French psychiatrists Jean Delay and Pierre Deniker, and then in Canada under research directed by Heinz Lehmann. Kurland's first chlorpromazine study (1955) was conducted concurrently with research underway by Joel Elkes, who was examining the substance in 1954 from Birmingham, England. Kurland's research on the effectiveness of antipsychotics addressed numerous diseases, including schizophrenia, addiction, psychosis and other acute psychiatric illnesses.

=== Research on antidepressants ===
Kurland published 14 articles on antidepressant medications, including nialamide, aletamine, dilantin, amoxapine among others. His later research included studies that aided the development of bupropion.

=== Other research ===
Among his published research, Kurland analyzed a variety of other clinical treatments for depression, addiction, anxiety and other diseases. His investigations of haloanisone, pyridoxine, and perphenazine-benztropine mesylate, are examples of the broad range of compounds that Kurland studied while his focus on other antipsychotics and psychedelics continued. Even more publications evidence Kurland's examination of general topics in psychiatry not directly related to clinical treatments, but describe appropriate admission procedures for psychiatric patients or the role of patients' general practitioners.

Kurland's attempts to observe the human condition were not limited to traditional research methodology common in medical science. While he typically utilized standard methodological protocols in his published work, he also considered phenomena that did not easily fit within the quantitative, positivist perspectives common in medical research. For example, as described by his former colleague Stanislav Grof, Kurland invited Joan Grant and Dennys Kelsey, European therapists who used hypnotic therapy to assist patients uncover past lives, to a symposium to inform research on the compound.
