= William A. Richards (psychologist) =

American psychologist (born 1940)

- Born: May 22, 1940 (age 86)
- Other name: Bill Richards
- Education: Yale Divinity School (1965); Andover Newton Theological School (1966); Catholic University of America (1975)
- Occupation: Clinical psychologist
- Years active: 1963–present
- Employer(s): Maryland Psychiatric Research Center (MPRC); Antioch University; Johns Hopkins University
- Known for: Psychedelic-assisted therapy research
- Notable work: Sacred Knowledge: Psychedelics and Religious Experiences (2015)

William A. Richards (born May 22, 1940), often known as Bill Richards, is an American clinical psychologist who has studied psychedelic-assisted therapy and the psychology of religious experience. He first tried psilocybin and began studying psychedelics with Hanscarl Leuner at the University of Göttingen in Germany in 1963. Subsequently, Richards studied psychedelic-assisted therapy with psychedleics like LSD, psilocybin, dipropyltryptamine (DPT), and 3,4-methylenedioxyamphetamine (MDA) at the Maryland Psychiatric Research Center (MPRC) of the Spring Grove Hospital Center in Baltimore, Maryland with colleagues like Stanislav Grof and Walter Pahnke from 1967 until 1977. Later, he studied psychedelics with Roland Griffiths, including at the Center for Psychedelic and Consciousness Research (CPCR), at Johns Hopkins University from the 1990s through the 2020s. Richards is the author of the 2015 book Sacred Knowledge: Psychedelics and Religious Experiences.

== Selected publications ==
- Pahnke WN, Richards WA (July 1966). "Implications of LSD and experimental mysticism". J Relig Health. 5 (3): 175–208. doi:10.1007/BF01532646. PMID 24424798.
- Grof S, Soskin RA, Richards WA, Kurland AA (1973). "DPT as an adjunct in psychotherapy of alcoholics". Int Pharmacopsychiatry. 8 (1): 104–115. doi:10.1159/000467979. PMID 4150711.
- * Grof S, Goodman LE, Richards WA, Kurland AA (1973). "LSD-assisted psychotherapy in patients with terminal cancer". Int Pharmacopsychiatry. 8 (3): 129–144. doi:10.1159/000467984. PMID 4140164.
- Richards WA (March 1975). Counseling, Peak Experiences and the Human Encounter with Death: An Empirical Study of the Efficacy of DPT-Assisted Counseling in Enhancing the Quality of Life of Persons with Terminal Cancer and Their Closest Family Members (Ph.D.). Washington, D. C.: The Catholic University of America. Archived from the original on 5 September 2026.
- Yensen R, Di Leo FB, Rhead JC, Richards WA, Soskin RA, Turek B, Kurland AA (October 1976). "MDA-assisted psychotherapy with neurotic outpatients: a pilot study". J Nerv Ment Dis. 163 (4): 233–245. doi:10.1097/00005053-197610000-00002. PMID 972325.
- Richards, William A. (2005). "Entheogens in the Study of Religious Experiences: Current Status*". Journal of Religion and Health. 44 (4): 377–389. doi:10.1007/s10943-005-7177-8. ISSN 0022-4197.
- Griffiths RR, Richards WA, McCann U, Jesse R (August 2006). "Psilocybin can occasion mystical-type experiences having substantial and sustained personal meaning and spiritual significance". Psychopharmacology (Berl). 187 (3): 268–283, discussion 284–292. doi:10.1007/s00213-006-0457-5. PMID 16826400.
- Johnson M, Richards W, Griffiths R (August 2008). "Human hallucinogen research: guidelines for safety". J Psychopharmacol. 22 (6): 603–620. doi:10.1177/0269881108093587. PMC 3056407. PMID 18593734.
- Griffiths R, Richards W, Johnson M, McCann U, Jesse R (August 2008). "Mystical-type experiences occasioned by psilocybin mediate the attribution of personal meaning and spiritual significance 14 months later". J Psychopharmacol. 22 (6): 621–632. doi:10.1177/0269881108094300. PMC 3050654. PMID 18593735.
- Griffiths RR, Johnson MW, Richards WA, Richards BD, McCann U, Jesse R (December 2011). "Psilocybin occasioned mystical-type experiences: immediate and persisting dose-related effects". Psychopharmacology (Berl). 218 (4): 649–665. doi:10.1007/s00213-011-2358-5. PMC 3308357. PMID 21674151.
- Richards, William A. (8 December 2015). Sacred Knowledge: Psychedelics and Religious Experiences. Columbia University Press. ISBN 978-0-231-54091-9.
- Griffiths RR, Johnson MW, Carducci MA, Umbricht A, Richards WA, Richards BD, Cosimano MP, Klinedinst MA (December 2016). "Psilocybin produces substantial and sustained decreases in depression and anxiety in patients with life-threatening cancer: A randomized double-blind trial". J Psychopharmacol. 30 (12): 1181–1197. doi:10.1177/0269881116675513. PMC 5367557. PMID 27909165.
- Richards, William A. (2017). "Abraham Maslow's Interest in Psychedelic Research: A Tribute". Journal of Humanistic Psychology. 57 (4): 319–322. doi:10.1177/0022167816670997. ISSN 0022-1678.
- Richards, William A. (2017). "Psychedelic Psychotherapy: Insights From 25 Years of Research". Journal of Humanistic Psychology. 57 (4): 323–337. doi:10.1177/0022167816670996. ISSN 0022-1678.
- Griffiths RR, Johnson MW, Richards WA, Richards BD, Jesse R, MacLean KA, Barrett FS, Cosimano MP, Klinedinst MA (January 2018). "Psilocybin-occasioned mystical-type experience in combination with meditation and other spiritual practices produces enduring positive changes in psychological functioning and in trait measures of prosocial attitudes and behaviors". J Psychopharmacol. 32 (1): 49–69. doi:10.1177/0269881117731279. PMC 5772431. PMID 29020861.
- Garcia-Romeu A, Richards WA (August 2018). "Current perspectives on psychedelic therapy: use of serotonergic hallucinogens in clinical interventions". Int Rev Psychiatry. 30 (4): 291–316. doi:10.1080/09540261.2018.1486289. PMID 30422079.
