= John H. Brodie =

American theoretical physicist

John Hartley Brodie
- Born: May 6, 1969; Worcester, Massachusetts, US
- Died: January 28, 2006 (aged 36); Brattleboro, Vermont, US
- Occupation: Theoretical physicist

John Hartley Brodie (May 6, 1969 – January 28, 2006), was an American theoretical physicist specializing in string theory. Diagnosed with bipolar disorder after a psychotic episode in 2002, he left academia in 2004.

== Early life and education ==
Brodie was born in Worcester, Massachusetts to the British born Quaker biochemists Angela Hartley Brodie and Harry Brodie. His grandfather Herbert Hartley had also been a biochemist. He was raised in Columbia, Maryland, where he graduated from Atholton High School. Brodie received bachelor's and master's degrees in physics from Cornell University in 1991 and 1992, respectively. He took one year off to travel the world, mainly in the Far East, where he developed an interest in Eastern philosophies and religions. He returned to doctoral studies at Princeton University, receiving a Ph.D. in theoretical physics in 1998.

== Scientific career, 1998-2004 ==
Brodie accepted post-doctorate offers first at the Stanford Linear Accelerator Center, and in 2001 at the Perimeter Institute for Theoretical Physics in Waterloo, Ontario, Canada. One of the first postdoctoral researchers at Perimeter institute, Brodie's work was notable for its breadth, ranging from non-perturbative effects in supersymmetric gauge theories to string theoretic descriptions of quantum Hall fluids and of inflationary cosmology. During his short career, he published fifteen articles in peer-review journals, many of which have proven to be influential. In 2002, Brodie had a psychotic episode and was diagnosed with bipolar disorder. He tried taking medication, but searched for an alternative to mainstream medicine.

== Humanistic life ==
In 2004, Brodie took a leave of absence from research and publication in disciplinary journals to teach at the Monteverde Friends School in Costa Rica. Traveling to Nicaragua, he helped construct housing for the poor with Habitat for Humanity. After his ID was stolen in Panama authorities stopped him on a bus and Brodie was held in jail.

In September 2005, after hiking much of the Appalachian Trail, he stopped in Brattleboro, Vermont and settled there. In Brattleboro, he worked packing grocery bags at the local Price Chopper supermarket and attended Quaker worship at nearby Putney Friends Meeting.

== Personal life and death ==
Brodie was "a sharp intellect, a free spirit and a gentle person". Friends and family have compared him to the mathematician John Nash.

On January 28, 2006, Brodie had been soliciting homes in Hinsdale, New Hampshire, that he was running for president. Police responded to a call and confronted him, after which he fled into the Connecticut River. His body was found five days later "not far from where he entered the river, about 150 feet from shore".

== Eponymous award ==
The Perimeter Institute for Theoretical Physics has been awarding an annual prize in Brodie's memory to celebrate independence and creativity in theoretical research. The first recipient of the John Brodie Prize was the quantum researcher Mohammad H. Ansari in 2006.
