= Angela Hartley Brodie =

British pharmacologist and cancer researcher

- Born: Angela Hartley; 28 September 1934; Oldham, England
- Died: 7 June 2017 (aged 82)
- Known for: Development of first aromatase inhibitors
- Spouse: Harry Brodie
- Children: 2, including John H. Brodie
- Awards: National Inventors Hall of Fame
- Scientific career
- Fields: Cancer research
- Institutions: Worcester Foundation for Experimental Biology, University of Maryland School of Medicine

Angela Hartley Brodie (28 September 1934 – 7 June 2017) was a British biochemist who pioneered development of steroidal aromatase inhibitors in cancer research. Born in Lancashire (now Greater Manchester), Brodie studied chemical pathology to a doctoral level in Sheffield and was awarded a fellowship sponsored by National Institutes of Health. After 17 years of working in Shrewsbury, Massachusetts on oral contraceptives with Harry Brodie, whom she married, she switched her research focus to the effects of the oestrogen-producing enzyme, aromatase, on breast cancer.

Brodie managed to get an aromatase inhibitor into a limited clinical trial in breast cancer patients in London, which had such a profound effect that it led to further Novartis-sponsored trials, and in turn to the development of formestane, the first aromatase inhibitor, eventually marketed in 1994.

Brodie's work has been hailed "as among the most important contributions to cancer cure".

== Early life and education ==
Brodie was born Angela Hartley on 28 September 1934 in Oldham, Lancashire, England. Her father, Herbert Hartley, was an industrial chemist working in polyurethanes who inspired her interest in science. Brodie was educated at a Quaker boarding school before studying at University of Sheffield, where she earned a degree in biochemistry.

After leaving university, she took a job in a blood bank before finding a laboratory position as a research assistant in the Department of Hormone Research at Manchester's Christie Hospital Whilst there, she concentrated on oestrogen-dependent breast cancer for two years before joining the University of Manchester to study for her doctorate.

In 1961, Brodie received her PhD in chemical pathology from the University of Manchester, where her research focussed primarily on the hormone aldosterone.

== Career ==
As a result of her doctorate, she was awarded a National Institutes of Health sponsored, 1-year post-doctoral training fellowship, at Clark University and the Worcester Foundation for Experimental Biology in Shrewsbury, Massachusetts. She researched at Worcester Foundation between 1962 and 1979. There, she worked initially on the oral contraceptive usage of aldosterone, alongside a number of scientists. This included Harry Brodie, whom she married in 1964, and Mika Hayano, who died of breast cancer in her 40s. Over the next few years, Brodie took time away from laboratory work when her two sons, Mark and John Hartley Brodie (1970–2006) were born.

When Brodie returned to work in 1971, she joined her husband's lab as staff scientist, moving into breast cancer research, especially its link with oestrogen and an enzyme that produces it, aromatase. They developed several steroidal aromatase inhibitors, she focused on 4-OHA.

In 1979, she moved to Maryland, encouraged by Cornelia Channing to join the University of Maryland School of Medicine, first as an associate professor. Later she became Professor of Pharmacology and Experimental Therapeutics along with an appointment in the Department of Physiology and a researcher role in the University of Maryland Greenebaum Cancer Center. She presented a paper on her aromatase inhibitors at a Rome conference in 1980, which led to collaboration with Charles Coombes, a British oncologist to start clinical trials on the inhibitor–4-hydroxyandrostenedione (4-OHA) in Royal Marsden Hospital. Coombes gave 4-OHA to 11 women in 1982, with 4 seeing a dramatic improvement. The results were encouraging enough that Novartis was willing to fund further clinical trials. 4-OHA, named Formestane, was the first aromatase inhibitor used on breast cancer patients and proved to be a significant improvement on tamoxifen, the standard cancer drug used to treat oestrogen receptor-positive breast cancer in postmenopausal women. The drug was first marketed in 1994.

"Brodie's major scientific awards recognize her development of aromatase inhibitors in the treatment of breast cancer as among the most important contributions to cancer cure."

— Rita M. Rooney

In 2005, Brodie received the prestigious Kettering Prize, the first woman to receive the award, though she did not know she had been nominated. At the time, she was on the editorial board of multiple professional journals, reviewed grant applications for the NIH, had published over 200 papers in peer-reviewed journals, and was a member of the integration for the US Army Department of Defense Army Breast Cancer Program.

In 2016, she retired from the University of Maryland.

== Personal life and death ==
According to co workers Brodie "was kind and generous but not weak. She knew how to stand up for herself and push her own agenda." She "had a steely determination combined with a positive can-do attitude." Brodie's hobbies were horseback riding, hiking and gardening.

In 2006, her son John, died from accidental drowning.

She never intended to retire, and collaborated with Vincent Njar on aromatase inhibitors in prostate cancer for the rest of her life. She died on 7 June 2017 at the age of 82 at her home in Fulton, Maryland, from complications due to Parkinson's disease.

== Awards ==
- 1998 Pharmacia and Upjohn International Award for Excellence in Published Clinical Research
- 2000 Komen Brinker Award for Scientific Distinction from Susan G. Komen for the Cure
- 2005 Charles F. Kettering Prize from the General Motors Cancer Research Awards
- 2006 Dorothy P. Landon-American Association for Cancer Research Prize for Translational Cancer Research
- 2006 Health Care Heroes Award sponsored by The Daily Record newspaper.
- 2007 University of Massachusetts Medical School presented Gregory Pincus Medal
- 2010 Jacob Heskel Gabbay Award in Biotechnology and Medicine
- 2010 Jill Rose Award for Distinguished Scientific Achievement
- 2012 Pharmacia-ASPET Award for Experimental Therapeutics
- 2013 Fellow of the American Association for Cancer Research Academy
- 2023 National Inventors Hall of Fame
