= Spring Grove Experiment =

American psychoactive drug study, 1963–1976

The Spring Grove Experiment is a series of lysergic acid diethylamide (LSD) studies performed from 1963 to 1976 on patients with psychotic illnesses at the Spring Grove Clinic in Catonsville, Maryland. These patients were sponsored by the National Institute of Mental Health to be part of the first study conducted on the effects of psychedelic drugs on people with schizophrenia. The Spring Grove Experiments were adapted to study the effect of LSD and psychotherapy on patients including alcoholics, heroin addicts, neurotics, and terminally-ill cancer patients. The research done was largely conducted by the members of the Research Department of Spring Grove State Hospital. Significant contributors to the experiments included Walter Pahnke, Albert Kurland, Sanford Unger, Richard Yensen, Stanislav Grof, William Richards, Francesco Di Leo, and Oliver Lee McCabe. Later, Spring Grove Research Department was rebuilt into the Maryland Psychiatric Research Center where studies continued to be performed for the advancement of psychiatric research. This study on LSD is the largest study on psychedelic drugs to date.

== Historical context ==
In 1943, Albert Hofmann discovered the hallucinogenic effects of LSD that led to an altered state of consciousness.

In 1947, Gion Condrau and Arthur Stoll observed that people diagnosed as "psychotics" had a stronger tolerance for LSD and that the effects of the drug were similar to the symptoms expressed by psychotics themselves.

In the late 1940s, English researcher Mayer-Gross found connections between schizophrenia and behaviors produced by LSD administration.

In 1950, AK Busch and WC Johnson determined LSD's stimulative effects and first made the connection of LSD and its potential use in psychotherapy.

In 1951, De Giacomo confirmed that when subjects with schizophrenia were given large dosages of LSD by mouth, they experienced a state of catatonia. He also stated that psychotic patients were more tolerant than healthy patients to LSD and required higher dosages to produce responses.

In 1953, D.W. Liddell and H. Weil-Malherbe studied the effects of LSD on mental processes and adrenaline in the blood and began characterizing the behaviors resulting from LSD administration to patients. They found that "depressive patients" experienced enhanced symptoms, becoming more depressed; while patients with schizophrenia experienced catatonic or altered states. They also found that after administering LSD through the patients' veins, adrenaline levels would fluctuate by rising, dropping, and rising, while blood glucose remained unaffected by the drug. Their method of administering LSD through the veins of patients with schizophrenia was adopted in later studies.

In 1953, Canadian researchers studied the use of LSD to treat alcoholism. It was found that those who treated their condition with LSD recovered more quickly than those who used a conventional treatment.

In the early 1960s in Psychedelic Research Institute in Prague, Czechoslovakia, Stanislav Grof tested the value of LSD in treatment of psychologically ill patients. His goal was to observe the effect of psychedelics on the psychology of terminally-ill cancer patients. Grof would later be involved in research at the Spring Grove Research Department.

== Psychedelic research at Spring Grove ==
Experiments at Spring Grove Research Department began in the 1950s at the Spring Grove State Hospital; however, the first official Spring Grove Experiment began in 1963. Over the course of the experiments, over 700 people were treated with LSD; no more than six to eight patients were treated at a time.

=== Preliminary experiments ===
The first psychedelic experiment at the Spring Grove research department took place in 1955. A small team of researchers including Albert Kurland, Louis S. Cholden, and Charles Savage set out to analyze the reaction following the administration of LSD to patients with chronic schizophrenia. In an attempt to conduct this study with scientific proof, the researchers administered LSD using a double blind procedure. By the end of the first study, the researchers determined that it was not possible to administer LSD using a double blind, because it was obvious to the researchers who had been given LSD. It was, however, found that LSD was unique in its effects on consciousness and unlike other drugs, resulted in rapid tolerance in patients. They determined the effects of LSD to include intense hallucinations and illusions. This work established the foundation for future experiments.

=== The Spring Grove Experiment: alcoholism and LSD ===
In 1963, after observing the initial effects of LSD, the first official experiment included in the "Spring Grove Experiment" series began. This experiment was performed on 69 alcoholic patients. Enthusiastic and hopeful about the possible results of LSD treatment, a team of researchers under Dr. Albert Kurland, Director of Research at State of Maryland Department of Mental Hygiene at the time, Dr. Charles Savage, Director of Research at Spring Grove Hospital, Dr. Shaffer, and Dr. Sanford Unger performed experiments to test LSD with psychotherapy as treatment for alcoholic patients. This work was backed by the State Hospital Alcoholic Rehabilitation Unit. The findings of this experiment were published four years later in 1967.

According to the experimenters themselves, the rationale for using psychedelics to treat alcoholic patients is in the "clinical picture" presented in the features of alcoholic patients. Various personality types such as "neurotic, psychopathic, and schizoid" were thought to have a vulnerability that led to their addiction to alcohol. These individuals were perceived as having a weakened ability to "handle psychological stress, tensions, and frustrations." They also believed that LSD would allow psychiatrists to open memories and emotions to restore and alter the brain and mind, but only under certain conditions.

The Spring Grove experiment was conducted in Cottage 13, a building on the Spring Grove State Hospital grounds. The environment in Cottage 13 was constructed so that it emitted a positive and optimistic atmosphere to ensure that the patients did not have a negative experience while taking the LSD treatment. Even the sounds, smells, and objects in Cottage 13 were carefully conditioned. Before treatment, the patients were screened after mental breakdowns to determine if they were eligible for LSD treatment. Then they were given a microscopic dose of LSD in Cottage 13. During the 14-hour treatment, the patients underwent psychotherapy so that psychiatrists could attempt to identify underlying conflicts. In addition to the psychotherapy, patients also underwent psychiatric tests so that researchers could determine other effects of LSD, such as changes in IQ scores.

Those who observed the experiments in Cottage 13 encouraged the continuation of it. One such individual was Dr. John Buckman, who claimed that "the treatment procedure seemed to be returning the patients to the human race."

The results show that no patients were harmed. After six months, 33% of patients remained abstinent after LSD treatment, as opposed to the previous statistic of 12% under conventional therapy.

In 1965, the Columbia Broadcasting System (CBS) television network produced a documentary called "LSD: The Spring Grove Experiment." LSD experimentation on the patients of Spring Grove became a part of the growing conversation on drugs. The success of this documentary led to an insurgence of federal funding that would go into building a new research center in 1969, called the Maryland Psychiatric Research Center.

=== Expansion ===
The success of the trials resulted in experiments that sought to determine if LSD could assist with the treatment of other disorders including neuroticism and heroin dependence.

In 1966, experiments expanded to treat those with terminal cancers. This type of experimentation arose at the Spring Grove clinic after one of the researchers became a human subject in the same clinic where she worked. Gloria underwent the radical mastectomy procedure to treat her breast cancer, and was subsequently diagnosed with liver cancer. Her resulting depression and anxiety were analogous to psychiatric symptoms, similar to those expressed by patients in the Spring Grove Clinic. After noticing the apparent effectiveness of LSD therapy on alcoholics, Gloria requested that an LSD treatment session be administered on herself. There had been existing studies on the chemotherapeutic analgesic effects of LSD, and the potential of LSD in alleviating the anguish of the dying. These most likely contributed to the permission Gloria received which allowed for the procedure. After consent was acquired, Gloria underwent psychedelic LSD therapy. She was administered a 200 microgram LSD session, and experienced successful results. She stated, "I am still me, but more at peace. My family senses this and we are closer. All who know me well say that this has been a good experience." Gloria died five weeks later.

The staff at Spring Grove noticed the potential of LSD in treatment and began treating terminally-ill cancer patients to relieve suffering in the time leading up to death. A research study was developed under Dr. Walter N Pahnke, a graduate from Harvard Medical School with a degree in medicine and specialty in psychiatry. He also received a Ph.D. in religion and divinity from the Harvard Graduate School of Arts and Sciences. The team was also influenced by the work of Dr. Eric Kast with cancer patients at the University of Chicago C. The thought was that LSD might serve as a narcotic and relieve the pain and suffering caused by cancer. In 1972, the study published a paper concluding that LSD had relieved pain in the terminally ill patients. Thirty one terminally ill patients were treated and statistical results showed that patients received considerable relief from pain.

From 1969 to 1972, a variety of experiments were conducted as LSD's effects on mental health, and heroin addiction were examined. By 1976, the research at Spring Grove, which at that time had been rebuilt and renamed the Maryland Psychiatric Research Psychedelic Clinic, had come to an end.

== Psychedelic psychotherapy ==
LSD was intravenously injected into patients, and at times was delivered through the form of a pill or clear liquid. In the early experiments, LSD was administered in a single large dose along with a specialized environment, eyeshades, headphones, and selected music. A preparatory period allowed a trained therapist to deeply explore the background of the patient. Doses ranged from 250 to 800 micrograms per session, which would last from 8–12 hours. This method was called the "mind-manifesting approach." By the late 1970s, a more extensive method was developed, called "the extended psychodelytic paradigm," as named by Stanislav Grof and discussed by Yensen & Dryer in their Spring Grove Experiment paper. This involved the administration of several high doses, an increased number of therapeutic sessions, and a greater emphasis on personal dynamics between therapist and patient.

It was not expected that positive results would occur with pure drug administration. Psychedelic therapy involves the use of a hallucinogenic, perception-altering drugs coupled with psychotherapy to treat patients psychologically. The goal of the procedure was to unearth internal conflicts by administering LSD and then use therapy to resolve and work through these emerging latent conflicts. "Mystical peaks" experienced by LSD-treated patients would often give the patient insights and new outlooks on life. Therapy would be used to apply these insights to the individual's personal life. Musical therapists eventually joined staffing. The main objective of therapy was to provide emotional support and companionship to the patient.

== Patients' experiences ==
In the original 1955 experiment conducted on patients with schizophrenia, there were 20 subjects that received LSD. The experiences and reactions of these subjects were categorized under 3 characteristics covert, which signified a subtle or delayed response; intensification, which pushed the patient's existing symptoms to extremes; and reversal, which occurred when patients assumed a state opposite to his or her original symptoms.

The following are accounts of patient responses during several experiments conducted at Spring Grove:

In the 1955 trials on people with chronic schizophrenia:

"This patient seemed most distressed and shaken. Intermittently she would open her mouth as if she were trying desperately to talk or at least to exercise the muscles of her mouth. She also expressed a state of acute anguish with her body movements...A half hour after the crying started, the wails seemed to end in a giggle. Soon the tears diminished, and she had almost continuous waves of laughing for another hour or so. The patient then began to walk about the ward studying the walls and windows as though she were seeing them for the first time. She seemed to respond to hallucinations, for she began to talk to non-present individuals."

A second patient in the 1955 study who was normally aloof, laughing, and idle became uncharacteristically serious 30 minutes after drug administration. She called the doctor by his correct name for the first time, saying:

"Dr. X, this is serious business—we are pathetic people—don't play with us."

In the 1965 CBS documentary, the story of Arthur King, a man experiencing alcoholism and being treated with LSD and psychotherapy, was highlighted. Some of the alcoholic patients who underwent LSD and psychotherapy treatment at Spring Grove felt happier after the treatment and had no more desire to drink. One patient, Arthur King, was admitted into Spring Grove State Hospital as an alcoholic. He underwent the treatment. Afterwards, he reported that he had no more desire to drink—he went back to school and later became an accountant. Years later when he was interviewed, he said that the LSD treatment turned his life around. In an interview conducted by Richard Yensen and Donna Dryer, Arthur King stated the following concerning treatment:

"There were times when you were very emotional. Yes. That was connected with what was...very unhappy…very! …Thinking about things in the past and very unhappy. Very, very miserable! But then I came to that point everything cleared up... it was like a peace. It was so strange."

The peak experience was defined by the following guidelines

1) Unity-the sense that "all is one."

2) Transcendence of the time-space boundaries associated with ordinary reality.

3) Deeply felt positive mood.

4) The sense that this experience is ultimately true or more real than real.

5) An experience that the opposites of daily life, rather than conflictual, become instead complementary, two sides of the same coin.

6) A sense or feeling of sacredness or of the preciousness of a feeling that the experience is beyond words.

7) The experience is transitory.

8) Though transitory, the experience has profound positive effects in the life of the person having it and is unforgettable

== Shortcomings ==
The first shortcoming determined early on in experimentation was that no adequate control group could be defined. This occludes the value of the results, and makes it difficult to deduce whether findings in the experiment were due LSD administration or simply just results of intense therapy following the drug administration. Another issue was the inability to conduct the experiment utilizing the blind double-blind procedure. An additional strong criticism of the experiments was that non-drug effects on the subjects were largely underestimated, and the effects of the LSD were possibly overestimated.

Although the overall outcome of the treatment in the Spring Grove Experiments was generally positive, there were also negative effects of LSD treatment in the patient including intense fear, uncontrollable breakdowns, and emotional stress during treatment. LSD was also known to produce feelings of depression, headache, and depersonalization in some cases. In addition, since subjects received LSD treatment and psychotherapy treatment, it is unclear whether the LSD caused the positive outcomes, the psychotherapy, or the carefully prepared combination of LSD and psychotherapy treatment.

These shortcomings demonstrate the possibility that beneficial results in the experiments may not be attributed solely to LSD treatment. Rather, it may be more likely that results occurred out of combination of the effects of social setting, therapy, and drug administration.

== Controversy and resistance ==
Resistance from the scientific community to psychedelic therapy is thought to have resulted from certain restrictive paradigms about how studies in psychiatry and psychology should be carried out, and which ones are valid. The existing concept supported single solutions to mental health issues, and prescribing pharmaceutical drugs to biologically suppress symptoms of diseases rather than root causes. This focus on pharmaceuticals existed partially because the large amounts of government funding given to pharmaceutical companies.

Controversy on the use of psychedelics as medical treatment was particularly significant considering this time period (1970) constituted the early stages of the declared "war on drugs." This, along with sensationalized negative LSD cases disseminated by the media, led to a declined attitude toward the usage of LSD as treatment. Other factors such as the accusation that scientists were mismanaging money, and the concern of LSD causing chromosome damage in 1969 led to further negative attitudes toward the study.

== Termination ==
The studies at Spring Grove State Hospital ended in 1976. Several factors led to the termination of the Spring Grove Experiment.

In 1971, Walter Pahnke, the director of clinical science and leader of the Spring Grove research team at the time, died. His successor had no background in psychedelic research and therefore did not have the experience or drive to continue the experimentation being led by Pahnke before he died. The Maryland Psychiatric Research Center was accused of improper use of public money and not engaging in real treatment that would be beneficial to the public.

When legislation was passed resulting in the detraction of funding from state hospitals, animosity grew between the more privileged researchers and the hospital employees. This discouraged workers from getting involved in experiments, adding to the growing negative atmosphere around LSD research. In addition, controversy surrounding the use of LSD in experiments surfaced. Among these controversies include reports of a suicide in Project MKUltra and treatment with LSD without informed consent at Edgewood Arsenal in the late 1970s. Because the arsenal had ties to the University of Maryland, there was dramatic pressure to discontinue all research involving psychedelics as treatment. The accumulation of these reports, along with general reservations about medicalizing what the media portrayed as strictly deleterious, led to the termination of the psychedelic experiments on human subjects at Spring Grove.

== Legacy ==
By 1976, more than 700 patients were treated with psychedelic drugs. This produced positive yet equivocal results. Most benefitted, and a minority did not display any response, however, there is no awareness of long-term complications.

By the 1970s, LSD was no longer recognized as having a medical use. It was instead seen as having a great potential for abuse and addiction. In the 1990s, even when Dr. Yensen and Dr. Kurland received FDA approval to continue LSD research, they were unable to acquire the LSD for clinical study in the United States.

Today, LSD research is gradually re-emerging as a focus for clinical researchers. In 2014, there was a study on the effects of LSD and psychotherapy on patients experiencing anxiety. In 2013, studies were being done on patients experiencing Post Traumatic Stress Disorder combining MDMA and psychotherapy; and in 2016, an article was released announcing the FDA's approval of clinical studies supporting further experiments to devise a drug for treatment of PTSD.

Dr. Kurland's initial hopes to produce "effective therapies that will heal – more quickly and comfortably – the psychic wounds that leave so many people handicapped and alienated" remain.
