= Xiaoming Li =

Chinese scientist

Xiaoming Li is a Chinese scientist.

Li earned a Bachelor of Science in computational mathematics at Nanjing University in 1982, and served as a lecturer there until 1987. Upon earning his PhD in educational psychology at the University of Minnesota in 1992, Li began teaching at the University of Maryland School of Medicine, moved to West Virginia University by 1999, then subsequently joined the Wayne State University faculty in 2003 and became the SmartState Endowed Chair for Clinical Translational Research at the University of South Carolina in 2015.
