= Joel Elkes =

English medical researcher

- Born: November 12, 1913; Königsberg, German Empire
- Died: October 30, 2015 (aged 101); Sarasota, Florida, United States
- Education: St Mary's Hospital Medical School
- Scientific career
- Workplaces: Johns Hopkins School of Medicine; McMaster University

Joel Elkes (12 November 1913 – 30 October 2015) was a leading medical researcher specialising in the chemistry of the brain. He qualified as a physician in London and later became a medical researcher who published the first double-blind scientific trial on chlorpromazine to treat schizophrenia. He is regarded as the father of modern neuropsychopharmacology and directed the first experimental psychiatric Uffculme Clinic in Birmingham, UK. He was responsible for the setting up of international organisations and university departments to further the investigation of the effects of psychopharmacy. He spent the latter part of his career endeavouring to bring higher levels of humanity, compassion and ethics to medical training.

== Early life ==
Elkes was born of Jewish parents Elkhanan and Miriam in the city of Königsberg (now Kaliningrad). His father served in the Russian Army as a medical officer during the Russian Revolution of 1905 and World War I. The family fled to Kovno (now Kaunas) in the newly formed Lithuanian Republic. Elkes attended Schwabe's Gymnasium, a Hebrew Jewish high school, with a Zionist orientation. Elkes was an outstanding student graduating with honours and developing an interest in chemistry. He hoped to become a "scientist serving medicine". This was born from the fact that he had a close relationship with his father whom he viewed as a great example of physicianship and a good person.

Following his education at the Gymnasium he spent a year in a German language school in Königsberg where he graduated at the top of his class. This was followed by four months at Lausanne University Hospital attending lectures as a run-up to medical training. At this time Elkes' father was physician to the British Ambassador in Lithuania and the ambassador encouraged Elkes to go to England to undertake medical training, providing a letter of recommendation for him. In 2011 in a talk to the American College of Neuropsychopharmacology Elkes identified three people who had inspired him: Einstein in physics, Erlich for his work on neuro-receptors, and Goethe for his rare combination of humanism, scientific creativity and spirit.

== Career ==
In 1930 Elkes enrolled in the St Mary's Hospital Medical School, Paddington in London where he was tutored by such medical luminaries as Charles Wilson, 1st Baron Moran, Almroth Wright, Alexander Fleming and Aleck Bourne, whose daughter Elkes would later marry. Here he met Professor Alistair Frazer and in 1939 he, Frazer and Steward (a student colleague) had a paper on fat absorption published in The Journal of Physiology.

The Second World War broke off his family connections and support. He found it difficult to support himself and his sister Sara but was offered a post by Alistair Frazer in the newly formed Transfusion Service where he met Charmian Bourne. Elkes graduated in 1941 and was invited by Frazer to join him as a research fellow in pharmacology at Birmingham University. In 1945 he was promoted to lecturer and in 1948 to senior lecturer and acting director of the department. His research output at this time was considerable, resulting in 16 publications. Elkes' experimental work involved the investigation of the physical chemistry, constitution and structure of biological membranes, the lipoproteins.

Suddenly I realised the nervous system was full of lipoproteins. It was myelin, a beautiful paracrystalline structure ubiquitously distributed throughout the nervous system.

Elkes work continued with a collaboration with a Ph.D crystallography student, Bryan Finean. Together they developed a technique for the X-ray diffraction of a living frog's sciatic nerve in response to temperature and chemicals. This led Elkes to study the anticholinesterases and the action of acetylcholine.

Concurrent with his laboratory work Elkes, together with his wife Charmian, (a general practitioner) started training at the City Hospital, Birmingham and carrying out trials on patients with catatonic schizophrenia using amobarbital, amphetamines and mephenesin. The results showed different responses and demonstrated the possible distribution of different controlling cells with the brain. This work, carried out between 1945 and 1950, brought the Elkes to the attention of the mental health milieu in the UK.

In the early 1950s Elkes researched LSD and remained interested in the substance for some time, forming a friendship with pioneering LSD therapist Ronald Sandison in the mid 1950s, and in 1965 inviting Czech LSD therapist Stanislav Grof to come to Baltimore to research LSD as a clinical and research fellow at the Henry Phipps Clinic and in the Research Unit of Spring Grove State Hospital.

In 1950 Elkes was awarded a Fulbright Travelling Fellowship in America where he worked at the New England Baptist Hospital in Boston and at Norwich State Hospital, Connecticut. On his return to Birmingham he was appointed chairman and professor of a new mental health department which he called The Department for Experimental Psychiatry. Elkes continued his work on anticholinesterase, acetylcholine blockers and amphetamines and their action on the activity of the brain and thus behaviour. At this time there was a chance discovery in France of a drug called chlorpromazine and in a double blind trial Elkes demonstrated the efficacy of this drug in controlling the symptoms of schizophrenia.

By the mid-1950s Elkes had established himself as the leader in the developing field of psychopharmacology. In 1954 he instigated the first international Neurochemical Symposium in Oxford, England, and in 1957 he arranged the first World Health Organization group on psychotropic drugs. In the same year he was invited to set up an experimental psychiatry programme, the first Clinical Neuropharmacology Research Centre for the National Institute of Mental Health in Washington, D.C. He published a collection of academic papers and became one of the first to suggest the important role of chemicals in the functioning of the brain. Following his move to Washington he resided permanently in the United States. Elkes regarded the centre as an academic "greenhouse" in which he toiled as "a good gardener". In 2011 he described those time thus:

It was a wonderful heady time in the middle of a very chronic mental hospital. There were people coming from virtually all over the world and there were talks and discussions and excitement. At the same time there was always and always, which is what we had hoped, the presence of the patient. For example, you go to the canteen and there's a patient with schizophrenia hallucinating under a tree. You're never very far from the problem that bought you here. And, gradually there developed a sense of place, of belonging. Gradually, I realised that, my God, together we created something pretty wonderful.

In 1963 Elkes took a post as chairman of psychiatry at Johns Hopkins University in Baltimore, Maryland. He renamed his department the Department of Psychiatry and Behavioural Sciences and worked toward integrating psychiatry with the physical medicine disciplines. His educational innovations attracted a number of other medical luminaries to his department. Among them were Sol Snyder, Joseph Coyle, Ross Baldessarini and Joseph V. Brady. Elkes was the founder and first Chairman of the Board of Fellowship House, a residential intermediate-care rehabilitation facility for people with mental illness which still exists in a developed form to the modern day.

Elkes left Johns Hopkins in 1974 and took a named professorship in McMaster University, Hamilton, Ontario, Canada, where he developed ideas about the need for self-awareness in physicians and the necessity to humanise medical education and training. He was also Emeritus Professor of Psychiatry at the University of Louisville, Kentucky, where he continued to develop his ideas of incorporating social, ethical and psychological dimensions with the biological foundation he had already created. He married Josephine Rhodes, and while living in Canada he returned to painting, a long-standing hobby. His summer home in Prince Edward Island, Canada, offered plenty of opportunity for this. It was also in their summer home on Prince Edward Island he completed his memoir on his father, Elkhanan Elkes.

== Awards and honours ==
- Elected first president of the American College of Neuropsychopharmacology in 1961
- Elkes was also a Senior Fellow of the Fetzer Institute, Kalamazoo, Michigan.
- Distinguished Professor Emeritus at the Johns Hopkins University.
- Distinguished Professor Emeritus of the University of Louisville.
- Charter Fellow of The Royal College of Psychiatrists of the United Kingdom.
- Fellow of the Royal College of Physicians and Surgeons of Canada
- Life Fellow of the American Psychiatric Association
- Recipient of the Thomas William Salmon Medal (1964)
- Governor's Citation for Distinguished Service, State of Maryland. (1969)
- Elected Fellow and Senior Scholar of the Fetzer Institute, Kalamazoo, Michigan.
- Fellow of the Royal Society of Arts and Sciences. (1974)
- Recipient of the International Hans Selye Award. (1994)
- Recipient of the International College of Neuropsychopharmacology Pfizer Pioneer Award at the CINP XXI Congress in Glasgow in 1998.

And others.

== Family life ==
His father, Elkhanan Elkes, an eminent Lithuanian physician, was interned in 1941 in Kovno's ghettos where the Nazi military appointed him leader of the Jewish internees. In 1944 the ghetto was attacked and the occupants shipped to concentration camps where Elkhanan, three uncles, an aunt and nieces and nephews all died. Elkes' mother survived the Landsberg-Dachau concentration camp and came to London. She later emigrated to Israel with her daughter, Sara, where she died in the 70s.

In December 1944 Elkes married Charmian Bourne. They had a daughter, Anna and later a granddaughter, Laura. Towards the end of his tenure in Johns Hopkins University (about 1974) he and Charmian divorced. Charmian died in 1996.

He married his second wife Josephine Rhodes in December 1975, she died in 1999 During his time in Ontario Elkes wrote a memoir about his father.

At his death he was married to Sally Lucke Elkes, an arts educator of Sarasota who encouraged him in his later water colour art work and arranged exhibitions of his work.

Throughout his life Elkes was an active supporter of his Jewish faith. He was a member of the Board of Trustees of the Hebrew University of Jerusalem, and chair of the Israeli Centre for Psychobiology. In 1989, together with Abba Eban, Zubin Mehta, and Daniel Inouye, he received an honorary degree from the Hebrew University.

In 1991 Elkes's sister, Sara, initiated a series of holocaust lectures in memory of their parents and using his memoir of his father Elkes delivered the inaugural address at the Stanley Burton Centre for Holocaust Studies in Leicester, England and in 1999 published the material.
