= Mark T. Gladwin =

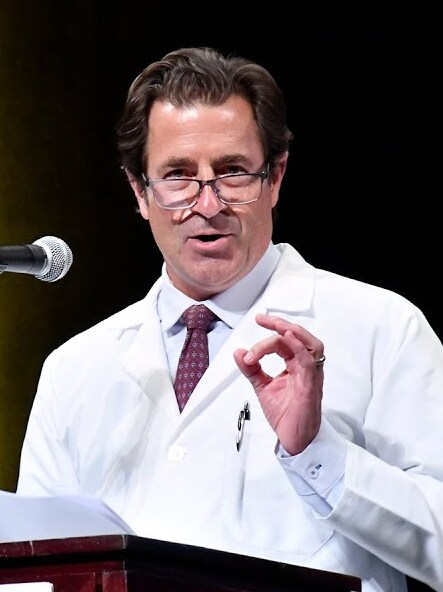
- Education: University of Miami
- Scientific career
- Fields: Heart and vascular medicine
- Workplaces: National Institutes of Health; University of Pittsburgh; University of Maryland School of Medicine
- Website: University of Maryland School of Medicine Office of the Dean

Mark T. Gladwin is an American physician-scientist and academic administrator serving as the dean of the University of Maryland School of Medicine since 2022. He is also the John Z. and Akiko K. Bowers Distinguished Professor and vice president for medical affairs of the University of Maryland, Baltimore.

== Education and career ==
Gladwin earned a B.S. and M.D. (1991) through the 6-year B.S.-M.D. honors program in medical education at University of Miami . He completed an internal medicine internship and residency in 1994 and served as chief resident in 1995 at the Oregon Health & Science University. He was a critical care fellow at the National Institutes of Health Clinical Center in 1996. In 1998, he completed a fellowship in pulmonary critical care at the University of Washington. He returned to the NIH Clinical Center as a senior research fellow in critical care medicine until 2000, also serving as the Chief of the Pulmonary and Vascular Medicine Branch of the National Heart, Lung, and Blood Institute.

Gladwin joined the University of Pittsburgh School of Medicine in 2008 as a professor and Division Chief of Pulmonary, Allergy and Critical Care Medicine, and also served as the inaugural director of the university's Vascular Medicine Institute. In 2015, he was appointed chair of the department of medicine. By the time Gladwin left the university in 2022, the department employed more than 1,000 faculty and had combined clinical and research revenues of almost $600 million.

=== University of Maryland ===
On August 1, 2022, Gladwin was appointed dean of the University of Maryland School of Medicine, succeeding longtime dean E. Albert Reece. He oversees 46 academic departments with a total annual operating budget of $1.3 billion and more than 7,000 faculty, trainees, students and staff.

Since becoming dean, Gladwin has helped launched new institutes and initiatives focusing on addiction medicine, health computing/ AI, neuroscience, bioengineering, new venture formation, and community health.

The Kahlert Institute for Addiction Medicine, within the school of medicine, focuses on understanding the underpinnings of addiction, uncovering new approaches to the treatment of opioid use disorder, bringing together neuroscientists studying the brain mechanisms underlying addictions and physician educators working to train a new generation of medical students and residents. The medical school's Medicine Institute for Neuroscience Discovery (UM-MIND) focuses on neurodevelopment and neuropsychiatric disorders, neurotrauma and brain injury, as well as aging and neurodegeneration.

To consolidate and amplify the school of medicine's global footprint in clinical care, research and education, Gladwin formed the Global Health Alliance focusing on improving health outcomes in developing countries through research collaborations and capacity building.

Gladwin was also involved in establishing the University of Maryland Institute for Health Computing (UM-IHC), located in North Bethesda, Maryland, which applies artificial intelligence and bioinformatics techniques to health data to support drug discovery, population health, and other computationally intensive research areas. He noted that he sees this part of Maryland “becoming the East Coast Silicon Valley of health computing.

Gladwin's other major initiatives for the school of medicine include addressing the doctor shortage in Maryland. He established the Rural-MD Scholars Program, which trains medical students in caring for patients in Maryland's Eastern Shore region and aims to reduce the shortage of clinicians in rural practice. He also helped establish the Edward & Jennifer St. John Center for Translational Engineering and Medicine, which brings together engineering and clinical faculty to research bioengineering solutions to medical challenges.

In 2025, Gladwin, along with other leaders from the University of Maryland, Baltimore, and the University of Maryland Medical System, announced the receipt of a $50 million donation from billionaire philanthropist Tom Golisano. The donation, the largest in the institution's history, will fund renovations to what is now known as the University of Maryland Golisano Children's Hospital, within the University of Maryland Medical Center.

Gladwin has also recruited new leadership in multiple academic departments, including internationally recognized inflammatory skin disorder expert Shawn Kwatra to chair the department of dermatology and leading pulmonologist Roberto Machado to chair the school's department of medicine Gladwin also recruited leading neuroanesthesiology expert David Mintz to chair the department of anesthesiology, maternal health researcher Andreea Creanga to chair the department of epidemiology and public health, Tarek Hanna, an expert in emergency and trauma radiology, as chair of the department of diagnostic radiology and nuclear medicine, and Irina Burd, the Sylvan Frieman, MD Endowed Professor, as Chair of the Department of Obstetrics, Gynecology & Reproductive Science. He hired new leaders for the school's research institutes, such as Elana Fertig to take the helm of the Institute for Genome Sciences, malaria vaccine researcher Stefan Kappe to direct the school's Center for Vaccine Development and Global Health, and Bradley A. Maron to co-direct the Institute for Health Computing.

=== Authorship ===
Gladwin is co-author of two medical textbooks in the "Made Ridiculously Simple" series from publisher Medmaster Inc. He wrote Clinical Microbiology Made Ridiculously Simple with physicians William Trattler and C. Scott Mahan, and Critical Care and Hospitalist Medicine Made Ridiculously Simple with physician Michael Donahoe.

== Research ==
Gladwin is a vascular, heart, and lung physician-scientist who has specialized in the study of reactive nitrogen molecules, like nitric oxide and nitrite, and how they regulate blood flow via reactions with hemoglobin. Researchers in the late 1970s discovered that nitric oxide (NO) regulated blood flow by triggering vasodilation, the widening of blood vessels. However, scientists considered metabolites of NO, such as nitrite (NO_{2}^{−}), to be inert. But in 2003, Gladwin and a team of researchers published a paper in Nature Medicine demonstrating that nitrite could also trigger vasodilation, through conversion to NO, under low oxygen conditions in the body such as during a heart attack or stroke. Subsequent studies by other researchers suggest nitrite administered before or immediately following a heart attack could help preserve heart tissue.

Gladwin has also conducted research on hemoglobin-related proteins, such as neuroglobin, and their possible application as antidotes to carbon monoxide poisoning. He currently serves as chair of the Board of Directors of Globin Solutions, Inc., a pre-clinical stage biopharmaceutical company researching rapidly acting antidotes for carbon monoxide poisoning, including a modified form of neuroglobin. In December 2023, Gladwin and his team of researchers published a study in Nature Communications on the discovery of the first-ever link between hemoglobin-like protein and normal cardiac development.

Gladwin's work on blood flow and hemoglobin also led to discoveries related to sickle cell disease. In 2004, Gladwin and his colleagues found that 10% of sickle cell patients also exhibited pulmonary hypertension, high blood pressure in the blood vessels that supply the lung, and determined that hypertension was a major cause of death among sickle cell patients. They described this new human disease syndrome, called hemolysis-associated pulmonary hypertension, in the New England Journal of Medicine.

In June 2020, Gladwin initiated a 22-site Phase II clinical trial in France, Brazil, and the U.S. that is exploring whether blood transfusions that use the patient's own blood can improve outcomes and extend survival in patients with sickle cell disease.

In 2025, Gladwin was named that year's recipient of the Assembly on Pulmonary Circulation Leadership Award from the American Thoracic Society.

In April 2026, University of Miami Miller School of Medicine honored Gladwin with the school's Medical Alumni Hall of Fame Award in recognition of his discoveries around nitrite signaling and pulmonary hypertension in sickle cell disease, as well as his overall career achievements to date.

== Personal life ==
Dr. Gladwin was born in Palo Alto, California, and was raised in various locations in the United States as well as in remote locations in Ghana, Guatemala, and Mexico. His parents, Hugh Gladwin, Ph.D., a professor of anthropology at Florida International University, and Christina Gladwin, Ph.D., a professor of food and resource economics at the University of Florida, studied in these locations.

He is married to Dr. Tammy Shields, an epidemiologist and scientific investigator who has published research on cancer epidemiology and prevention. They have three children.
