= Looking for Toxin X =

- Czech: Hledá se Toxin X
- Directed by: Vladimír Kabelík
- Screenplay by: Vladimír Kabelík
- Produced by: Zdenek Novák
- Starring: Stanislav Grof; Petr Oliva
- Narrated by: Vaclav Voska
- Cinematography: Svatopluk Malý
- Music by: Jan Klusák
- Production company: Krátký film Praha
- Distributed by: Ústřední půjčovna filmů
- Release date: 1962
- Running time: 15 minutes
- Country: Czechoslovakia
- Language: Czech

Looking for Toxin X (Czech: Hledá se Toxin X) is a Czechoslovak short popular science documentary about LSD.

== Plot ==
A dose of LSD is given to a DAMU theatre student, Petr Oliva, by the Czech psychiatrist Stanislav Grof. Special effects convey the subjective experience of the experimental subject. The film's central premise is the search for ‘toxin x’, which is supposed to be at the root of all mental disorders. The medics believe that LSD will help them locate it.

== Cast ==
- Stanislav Grof
- Petr Oliva
- Vaclav Voska (Narrator)

== Production ==
The whole film crew were also given LSD during filming. The experimental subject Oliva (who went on to become a prominent Czech actor) later recalled that the reason everyone was given the drug was because, “we had to see for ourselves what happens to a person [when they are given the drug].”

Excerpts from the film appear in the documentary LSD made in ČSSR (2015) directed by Pavel Křemen.”
