= University of Maryland Marlene and Stewart Greenebaum Comprehensive Cancer Center =

Cancer center in Baltimore, Maryland, US

The University of Maryland Marlene and Stewart Greenebaum Comprehensive Cancer Center (UMGCCC) is a National Cancer Institute (NCI)-designated comprehensive cancer center located in Baltimore, Maryland.

== Overview ==
The UMGCCC is located on the medical campus of the University of Maryland in Baltimore, and is part of the university's medical center and its school of medicine as well. All researchers and physicians at the center are also faculty members of the medical school and other professional schools at the University of Maryland, Baltimore.

The center actively participates in new drug development and conducts pilot studies and Phase I, II and III clinical trials.

In addition to basic and clinical cancer research, cancer center activities include teaching and a strong focus on aggressive treatment for cancer patients in the 40-bed inpatient unit, dedicated Bone Marrow/Stem Cell Transplantation unit, and 25,000-square-foot (2,300 m^{2}) outpatient facility, which opened in 2005.

The center has multidisciplinary clinical programs for all major cancers (breast, brain, cutaneous, head and neck, gastrointestinal, genitourinary, gynecological, hematologic malignancies, and thoracic cancer).

In 2024, UMGCCC was named one of the best hospitals for cancer care by U.S. News and World Report.

== History ==
The University of Maryland's cancer center began as the intramural program of the National Cancer Institute (NCI) of the NIH. In 1965, the NCI created an intramural program in the Division of Cancer Treatment (DCT) located at the U.S. Public Health Service (USPHS) Hospital in Baltimore. Chemotherapy for cancer was beginning to be recognized as an integral part of modern cancer care, and the NCI was at the forefront of new approaches. The impetus for this off-campus intramural program was the need for additional beds for the NCI's in-house Phase I and Phase II studies.

Because the NCI was a Federal organization, officials selected the Federal USPHS Hospital to serve as the source of beds relatively close to the Bethesda campus. The intramural program was formally designated as the Baltimore Cancer Research Center (BCRC) of the NCI. It included 40 beds, an 8-bed intensive care unit (ICU), a radiation oncology unit, and basic science laboratories of pharmacology and biochemistry, each directed by senior NCI personnel. The facility had the advantage of being close to the home campus, and its laboratory base was located in a city with a large patient population for referral for studies. The BCRC was involved in many studies, and the staff were highly productive, publishing multiple peer-reviewed papers in high-quality journals. For example, many patients in the landmark studies of MOPP treatment for Hodgkin's disease were treated at the BCRC.

In 1974 the clinical unit of the BCRC moved to the University of Maryland Medical Center, and in 1976 the BCRC laboratories moved into the University of Maryland School of Medicine. The center remained an intramural NCI program under contractual arrangement between NCI and the University of Maryland at Baltimore. In 1978 its name was changed to the Baltimore Cancer Research Program (BCRP). From its inception, the BCRP was very active in clinical research with protocols developed by BCRP staff and via national groups such as the Cancer and Leukemia Group B (CALGB). The BCRP was also very active in basic and applied laboratory research in pharmacology, enzymology, immunology, and microbiology.

In 1981 the National Cancer Institute divested the Baltimore Cancer Research Program from the federal government, and the University of Maryland School of Medicine and the Medical Center established the University of Maryland Cancer Center.

In 1996, the center's name was changed to the Marlene and Stewart Greenebaum Cancer Center (UMGCC) in recognition of a $10 million gift by its namesake benefactors: Baltimore philanthropists Marlene and Stewart Greenebaum and in 2008, was selected to be a designated cancer center by the NCI becoming 1 of 64 centers throughout the United States to have earned that distinction.

After earning the NCI's highest designation of Comprehensive Cancer Center, the university changed the center's name and since 2016, has been called the University of Maryland Marlene and Stewart Greenebaum Comprehensive Cancer Center.

== Notable Clinical and Research Activities ==
- UM Professor of pharmacology Angela H. Brodie, Ph.D., pioneered the development of a new class of breast cancer drugs, aromatase inhibitors, now the standard of care for women worldwide.
- UM Radiation oncology physicists developed direct aperture optimization (DAO), an IMRT planning technique that dramatically reduces treatment time.
- Research in new drug development and new anti-cancer drugs. Virtually every important drug in use in oncology today has been tested in this program, and the center has contracts in both the public and private sectors with a commitment to clinical and laboratory research.
- Strong translational research program in immunotherapy and biological therapy of cancer and is developing a gene therapy program focused primarily on hematologic malignancies.
- Leader in minority participation in clinical studies. In 2024, more than 50 percent of participants in interventional clinical trials were minorities, far exceeding national averages reported in the Journal of Clinical Oncology.
- Partnership with the state of Maryland through the Maryland Cigarette Restitution Fund Program, which provides funds to strengthen research programs, expand clinical trials, and recruit world-class scientists and cancer specialists.
