= Stanislav Grof =

American psychiatrist

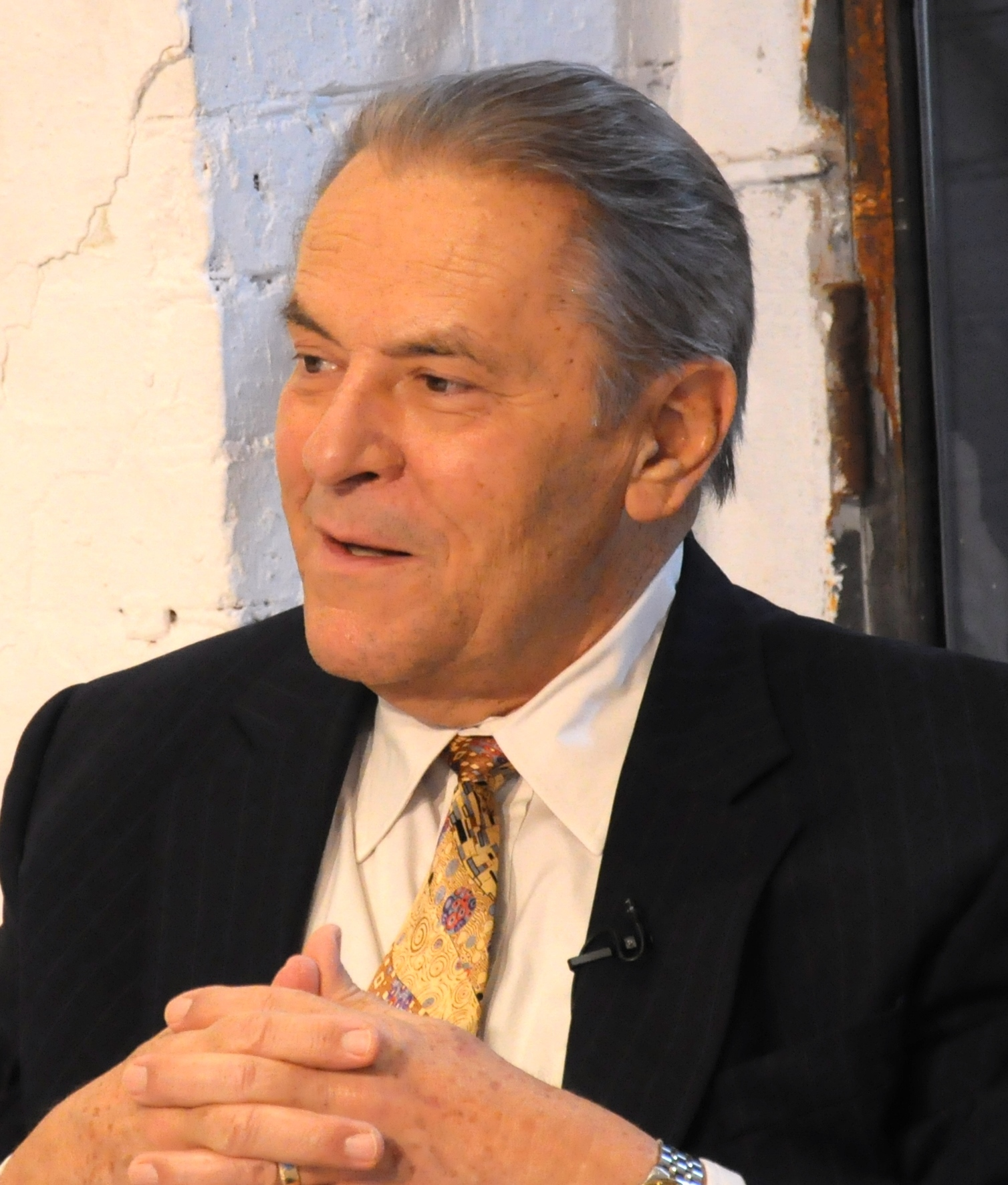
- Stanislav Grof in 2009
- Born: July 1, 1931 (age 95); Prague, Czechoslovak Republic
- Education: Charles University, Czechoslovak Academy of Sciences
- Occupation: Psychiatrist
- Known for: Transpersonal psychology, perinatal matrices, hylotropic and holotropic, spiritual emergency
- Spouse(s): Joan Halifax (m. 1972; div. approx. 1975), Christina Grof (m. 1978; died 2014), Brigitte Grof (m. 2016)
- Scientific career
- Fields: Psychology, psychiatry
- Workplaces: Johns Hopkins University; University of Maryland, Baltimore; Esalen Institute; California Institute of Integral Studies

Stanislav Grof (born July 1, 1931) is a Czech-born American psychiatrist. Grof is one of the principal developers of transpersonal psychology and research into the use of non-ordinary states of consciousness for purposes of psychological healing, deep self-exploration, and obtaining growth and insights into the human psyche.

== Early life and education ==
Stanislav Grof was born July 1, 1931 in Prague, Czechoslovak Republic. Grof received his M.D. from Charles University in Prague in 1957 and then completed his Ph.D. in medicine at the Czechoslovak Academy of Sciences in 1965, training as a Freudian psychoanalyst at this time.

== Career ==
Czechoslovakia was the centre of psychedelic research behind the Iron Curtain during the Soviet empire in the 1950s and 1960s. Grof’s early research in the clinical uses of psychedelic substances was conducted at the Psychiatric Research Institute in Prague, where he was principal investigator of a program that systematically explored the heuristic and therapeutic potential of LSD and other psychedelic substances.

In 1967, he received a scholarship from the Foundations Fund for Research in Psychiatry in New Haven, Connecticut, and was invited by Joel Elkes to be a Clinical and Research Fellow at Henry Phipps Clinic, a part of Johns Hopkins University School of Medicine in Baltimore, United States. In 1969, he went on to become Chief of Psychiatric Research for the Spring Grove Experiment at the Research Unit of Spring Grove State Hospital (later part of the Maryland Psychiatric Research Center where he worked with Walter Pahnke. In 1969, Grof also became Assistant Professor of Psychiatry at the Johns Hopkins University.

In 1973 he was invited to the Esalen Institute in Big Sur, California, and lived there until 1987 as a Scholar-in-Residence, developing his ideas and conducting month-long workshops. In 1977, Grof was the founding president of the International Transpersonal Association, serving as president for several subsequent decades. He went on to become distinguished adjunct faculty member of the Department of Philosophy, Cosmology, and Consciousness at the California Institute of Integral Studies, a position he remained in until 2018.

In May 2020, he launched, with his wife Brigitte Grof, a new training in working with holotropic states of consciousness, the international Grof Legacy Training.

== Thought ==
=== Psychedelics and breathwork ===
Grof's early studies were of LSD and its effects on the psyche—the field of psychedelic therapy. Building on his observations while conducting LSD research and on Otto Rank's theory of birth trauma, Grof constructed a theoretical framework regarding prenatal and perinatal psychology and transpersonal psychology. In Grof's view, LSD sessions reveal the psychopathology of an individual to reflect their experience of the stages of birth. He describes four stages: (1) embryonic peace and transpersonal connection, (2) inundation with bodily matter during fetal growth, (3) the stress of the prenatal period, and (4) the release of birth. Various neuroses are mapped to traumas at particular stages, e.g., ennui could be caused by Caesarean section, resulting in an individual feeling like they have little reason to exert effort. Suicidal ideation is explained by the deep memory of prenatal suffering being terminated by release from the womb (transposed to an escape from life itself). Chemical addiction could stem from the use of anesthesia during birth. Religious belief (e.g., identification with the crucifixion of Jesus) is also linked to birth, with reincarnation explaining transpersonal experiences.

Grof called a developed form of his theory an "expanded cartography of the human psyche". Following the suppression of legal LSD use in the early 1970s, Grof pursued this therapeutic direction without drugs, by codeveloping with his wife, Christina Grof, a combination of deep and rapid breathing, evocative music, focused bodywork, and mandala drawing. Originally termed "Holotropic Breathwork", he now uses the trademark Grof Breathwork to describe this technique.

=== Interplay of hylotropic and holotropic impulses in the psyche ===
Grof distinguishes between two modes of consciousness: the hylotropic and the holotropic. The hylotropic mode relates to "the normal, everyday experience of consensus reality". In contrast, holotropic is characteristic of non-ordinary states of consciousness such as meditative, mystical, or psychedelic experiences. According to Grof, contemporary psychiatry often categorizes these non-ordinary states as pathological. Grof connects the hylotropic to the Buddhist conception of namarupa ("name and form"), the separate, individual, illusory lower self. He connects the holotropic to the Hindu conception of Atman-Brahman.

=== Hypothesis on near-death experiences ===
In the late 1970s, Grof proposed a psychological hypothesis to explain the near-death experience (NDE). According to Grof, the NDE reflects memories of the birth process with the tunnel representing the birth canal. Susan Blackmore wrote that the hypothesis is "pitifully inadequate to explain the NDE. For a start the newborn infant would not see anything like a tunnel as it was being born." The psychologist Chris French has written "the experience of being born is only very superficially similar to the NDE" and the hypothesis has been refuted as it is common for those born by caesarean section to experience a tunnel during the NDE. Michael Shermer also criticized the hypothesis "there is no evidence for infantile memories of any kind. Furthermore, the birth canal does not look like a tunnel, and besides the infant's head is normally down and its eyes are closed." An article in the peer-reviewed APA journal Psychology of Consciousness suggested that Grof's patients may have experienced false memories of birth and before birth.

== Influence on other researchers ==
Grof's collaboration with Richard Tarnas began in the early 1970s, when Tarnas moved to the Esalen Institute in Big Sur to write his dissertation on psychedelic therapy under the auspices of Grof. They would eventually research a new way of understanding the timing and content of experiences encountered in holotropic states of consciousness, which Tarnas refers to as "archetypal cosmology".

== Accolades ==
In 1993, Grof received an Honorary Award from the Association for Transpersonal Psychology for major contributions to and development of the field of transpersonal psychology, given at the occasion of the 25th Anniversary Convocation held in Asilomar, California. He also received the VISION 97 award granted by the Foundation of Dagmar and Václav Havel in Prague on October 5, 2007. In 2010, he received the Thomas R. Verny Award from the Association for Pre- and Perinatal Psychology and Health.

== Documentaries ==
In 1962, Grof was in a short documentary about LSD called Looking for Toxin X.

Grof was featured in the film Entheogen: Awakening the Divine Within, a 2006 documentary about rediscovering an enchanted cosmos in the modern world.

The 2018 documentary Bufo Alvarius: The Underground Secret features Grof talking in detail about the effects of 5-MeO-DMT on the brain and consciousness.

In 2020, the documentary The Way of the Psychonaut was released, which explores Grof's lifework and contributions to transpersonal psychology.

== Personal life ==
In August 2018, Grof suffered a stroke that affected his speech.

== Works ==
- Realms of the Human Unconscious: Observations from LSD Research. New York: The Viking Press (1975).
- The Human Encounter with Death. New York: E. P. Dutton (1977).
- Dimensions of Dying and Rebirth. (1977).
- LSD Psychotherapy. Hunter House (1980).
- Beyond Death: The Gates Of Consciousness with Christina Grof. (1981).
- East & West: Ancient Wisdom And Modern Science. (1985).
- Beyond the Brain: Birth, Death And Transcendence In Psychotherapy. (1985).
- Human Survival And Consciousness Evolution, edited with Marjorie L. Valier. (1988).
- The Adventure of Self-Discovery: Dimensions of Consciousness and New Perspectives in Psychotherapy and Inner Exploration. Albany: SUNY Press (1988). ISBN 978-0887065408.
- Spiritual Emergency: When Personal Transformation Becomes A Crisis, with Christina Grof. (1989).
- The Stormy Search For The Self: A Guide To Personal Growth Through Transformative Crisis, with Christina Grof. (1990).
- The Holotropic Mind: The Three levels Of Human Consciousness And How They Shape Our Lives, with Hal Zina Bennet. New York: Harper Collins (1993).
- Books Of The Dead: Manuals For Living And Dying. (1994).
- The Cosmic Game: Explorations Of The Frontiers Of Human Consciousness. (1998).
- The Consciousness Revolution: A Transatlantic Dialogue, with Peter Russell and Ervin Laszlo. (1999).
- Psychology Of The Future: Lessons From Modern Consciousness Research. (2000).
- The Call of the Jaguar. (2002).
- Caterpillar Dreams, with Melody Sullivan. (2004).
- When The Impossible Happens: Adventures In Non-Ordinary Reality. (2006).
- The Ultimate Journey: Consciousness And The Mystery Of Death. (2006).
- LSD: Doorway to the Numinous: The Groundbreaking Psychedelic Research into Realms of the Human Unconscious. (2009).
- Holotropic Breathwork: A New Approach to Self-Exploration and Therapy. (2010).
- Healing Our Deepest Wounds: The Holotropic Paradigm Shift. (2012).
- Modern Consciousness Research and the Understanding of Art: Including the Visionary World of H. R. Giger. Santa Cruz: Multidisciplinary Association for Psychedelic Studies (2015). ISBN 9780979862298.
- The Way of the Psychonaut: Encyclopedia for Inner Journeys (Volume One). Santa Cruz; Multidisciplinary Association for Psychedelic Studies (2019). ISBN 9780998276595.
- The Way of the Psychonaut: Encyclopedia for Inner Journeys (Volume Two). Santa Cruz: Multidisciplinary Association for Psychedelic Studies (2019). ISBN 9780998276557.
- The Experience of Death and Dying: Psychological, Philosophical, and Spiritual Aspects. Spirituality Studies 1 (2): 3-31 (2015).
- Ken Wilber’s Spectrum Psychology: Observations from Clinical Research. Spirituality Studies 2 (2): 2-19 (2016).
- Psychology for the Future: Lessons form Modern Consciousness Research. Spirituality Studies 2 (1): 3-36 (2016).
