= Herbert Hartley =

English industrial chemist

Working on adhesive for the sticky bomb in 1943 at Kay Brothers in Stockport where Hartley was the technical manager.

Herbert Kent Hartley (1908–1986) was an industrial chemist who pioneered the use of polyurethane in the UK, for which he was awarded the Gold Medal of the Plastics and Rubber Institute. He also devised an adhesive for the sticky bomb in World War 2. He was a keen climber and helped to organise the sport in the UK, founding the Manchester University Mountaineering Club, serving as the secretary of the Mountain Rescue Committee and president of the Rucksack Club.

Fellow climber, Frank Solari, praised Hartley in his obituary for Alpine Journal,

His personal qualities were of the highest. Able to converse on many subjects, he knew when to appreciate silence. Under intolerable weather conditions he never lost his head or temper. His natural courtesy avoided offence when his intellect forced him to disagree with others. On rock he was determined with an elegant, almost dainty, technique which served him well on the gritstone climbs that he pioneered.
