= University of Maryland School of Medicine =

Public medical school in Baltimore, Maryland, US

Coordinates: 39.289032°N 76.625685°W

- Type: Public
- Established: December 23, 1807; 218 years ago
- Parent institution: University of Maryland, Baltimore
- Affiliations: University of Maryland Medical Center & Medical System
- Dean: Mark T. Gladwin
- Faculty: 6,028
- Students: 1,261 (total): MD – 621; PhD – 228; MD/PhD – 56; MPH – 55; DPT/PhD – 186; Other – 74
- Location: Baltimore, Maryland, U.S.
- Website: medschool.umaryland.edu

The University of Maryland School of Medicine (abbreviated UMSOM), located in Baltimore City, Maryland, U.S., is the medical school of the University of Maryland, Baltimore and is affiliated with the University of Maryland Medical Center and Medical System. Established in 1807 as the College of Medicine of Maryland, it is the first public and the fifth oldest medical school in the United States. UMB SOM's campus includes Davidge Hall, which was built in 1812, and is the oldest building in continuous use for medical education in the Northern Hemisphere.

In addition to an MD degree, the UMB SOM offers PhD programs through the Graduate Program in Life Sciences. It also offers several joint degree programs: a Medical Scientist Training Program (MSTP) MD/PhD, a joint MD/DDS (Doctor of Dental Surgery), the MD/MPH (Master of Public Health) program, and the PhD/DPT (Doctor of Physical Therapy).

The University of Maryland School of Medicine was ranked 15th in U.S. News & World Report's 2023 rankings of "Best Medical Schools: Primary Care", and 29th in "Best Medical Schools: Research". In 2013, the school offered admission to 6.3% of applicants. Dr. Mark T. Gladwin, MD has been the Dean of Medicine since August 1, 2022.

== History ==
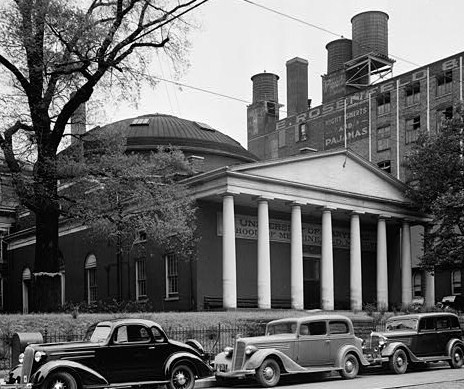
University of Maryland, Medical Building (Davidge Hall) in July, 1936

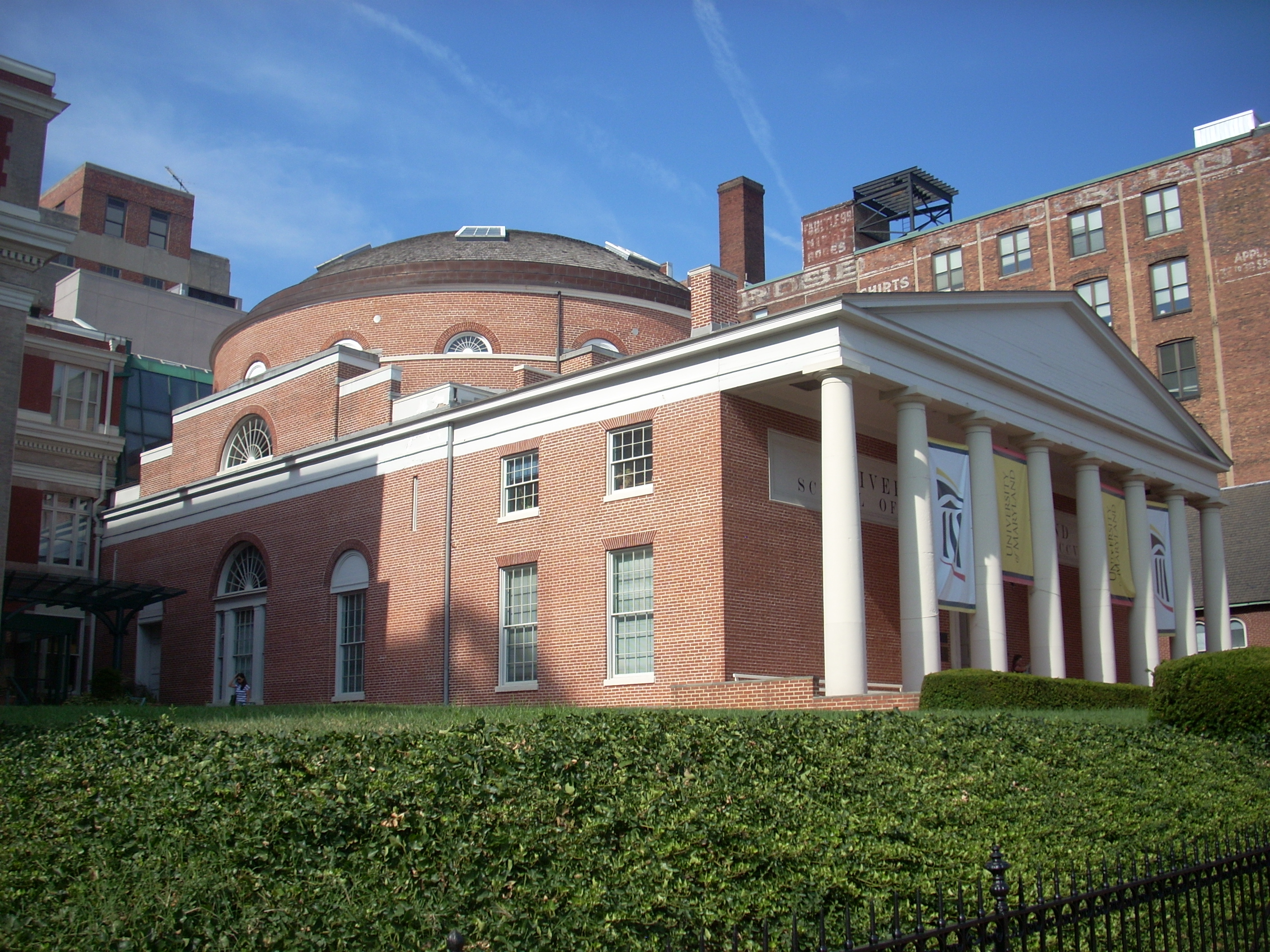
Davidge Hall in August 2011

Chartered as the College of Medicine of Maryland in December 1807, the University of Maryland School of Medicine was the founding school of the University System of Maryland and the only public medical school in the U.S. at the time. It is the fifth oldest medical school in the country after the medicals schools at Columbia University (established May 1807), Dartmouth College (1798), Harvard University (1782), and the University of Pennsylvania (1765).

Its founding by Nathaniel Potter and John Beale Davidge was part of an influx of professionals to Baltimore and the rapid urban development that immediately followed the American Revolution. By the late 1780s, there was public discussion about the need for "medical reform and suppression of quackery". A group of physicians made several short-lived attempts at starting medical schools around the turn of the 19th century, and were finally successful in 1807 when the Maryland state legislature passed the Medical College Bill, authorizing the formation the College of Medicine of Maryland. In 1812 it was rechartered as the University of Maryland School of Medicine.

Davidge Hall, built in 1812 and still in use today, is the original building of the College of Medicine of Maryland. It is listed on the National Register of Historic Places as the oldest building in continuous use for medical education in the United States. In the 1950s, the building was named after John Beale Davidge, one of the founders and the first dean of the College of Medicine of Maryland.

Beginning in 1938, the school instituted antisemitic quotas limiting Jewish applications to 14%. The school also limited the number of local applicants in an attempt to reduce the number of Jewish students, given the large number of Jewish people living in the Maryland suburban communities of Prince George's and Montgomery counties. The anti-Jewish quota system was abandoned in 1950.

== Research ==
Researchers at the University of Maryland School of Medicine have made several milestone discoveries in the field of biomedical research and therapeutics. Recent discoveries include the development of aromatase inhibitors for the treatment of breast cancer by the lab of Angela Brodie, and the discovery of calcium sparks as drivers of heart contraction by the lab of Jonathan Lederer.

The School of Medicine is a research-focused academic institution, with $537 million in extramural research funding in 2018. A large portion of that research funding comes from the federal government of the United States. As of 2016, over $148 million in research grants from the NIH were attributed to the parent university of the School of Medicine. Focus areas of the University of Maryland School of Medicine's research include cancer research, organ transplant research, cardiovascular research, neuroscience, and virology.

The School of Medicine has extensive operations in research education. Together with the Graduate Program in Life Sciences, the school provides research teaching and oversees the award of Ph.D. degrees across multiple research tracks. The School of Medicine is one of only 50 medical institutions in the United States to offer a Medical Scientist Training Program.

The School of Medicine has launched several research centers and institutes dedicated to specific fields of research:

=== The Institute of Human Virology ===
The Institute of Human Virology (IHV) was formed in 1996 as a research institute of the University of Maryland School of Medicine, headed and co-founded by Robert Gallo, the only recipient of two Lasker Awards for the discovery of the first human retrovirus, and the discovery of HIV as the cause of AIDS. IHV operates in a dedicated building on the UMSOM campus next to the University of Maryland Medical Center as a partnership between the State of Maryland, the City of Baltimore, the University System of Maryland and the University of Maryland Medical System.

=== The Institute for Genome Sciences ===
Launched in 2007, the Institute for Genome Sciences (IGS) is a genomics research center at the University of Maryland School of Medicine. IGS investigators use genomic and bioinformatic tools to research genome function in health and diseases and work in interdisciplinary collaborations with biomedical investigators. IGS is led by Dr. Claire M. Fraser-Liggett. Research areas include: Bioinformatics, Cancer Genomics, Functional Genomics, Human Genetic Variation, Infectious Diseases, Organismal Diversity and Evolution, Human Microbiome Project, Plant Genomics, and Microbial Community Ecology. Investigators at IGS work on Disease Ontology research, the Data Analysis and Coordination Center (DACC) for HMP, and other grants. IGS is one of the Genome Sequencing Center for Infectious Diseases (GSCID) centers designated by NIAID.

=== The Institute for Global Health ===
The Institute for Global Health (IGH) was established in 2015. The IGH develops new and improved ways of diagnosing, preventing, treating, controlling and eradicating diseases of global impact. Such diseases include malaria, Ebola and vaccine-preventable infectious diseases such as measles. The IGH includes the Center for Vaccine Development (CVD) and the Division of Malaria Research.

=== Maryland Psychiatric Research Center ===
The MPRC was established on the grounds of Spring Grove Hospital as a result of public interest in the research pioneered there on the use of the psychedelic compound LSD in Schizophrenia research. The first of this series of experiments, which came to be known as the Spring Grove Experiment, began in 1955 in cottage 13 of the hospital grounds. The study was largely conducted by the members of the Research Unit of Spring Grove State Hospital, and became the largest study on psychedelic drugs in psychiatric research. After the study gained media publicity, research funding was made available and a new building was constructed on the north side of the hospital grounds to house MPRC, a division of the department of Psychiatry of the University of Maryland School of Medicine. Currently, MPRC hosts over 20 clinical and basic research faculty that form its core research program into psychiatric disease. MPRC is also the editorial seat for the Schizophrenia Bulletin, a peer-reviewed medical journal dedicated to schizophrenia research.

== Departments ==
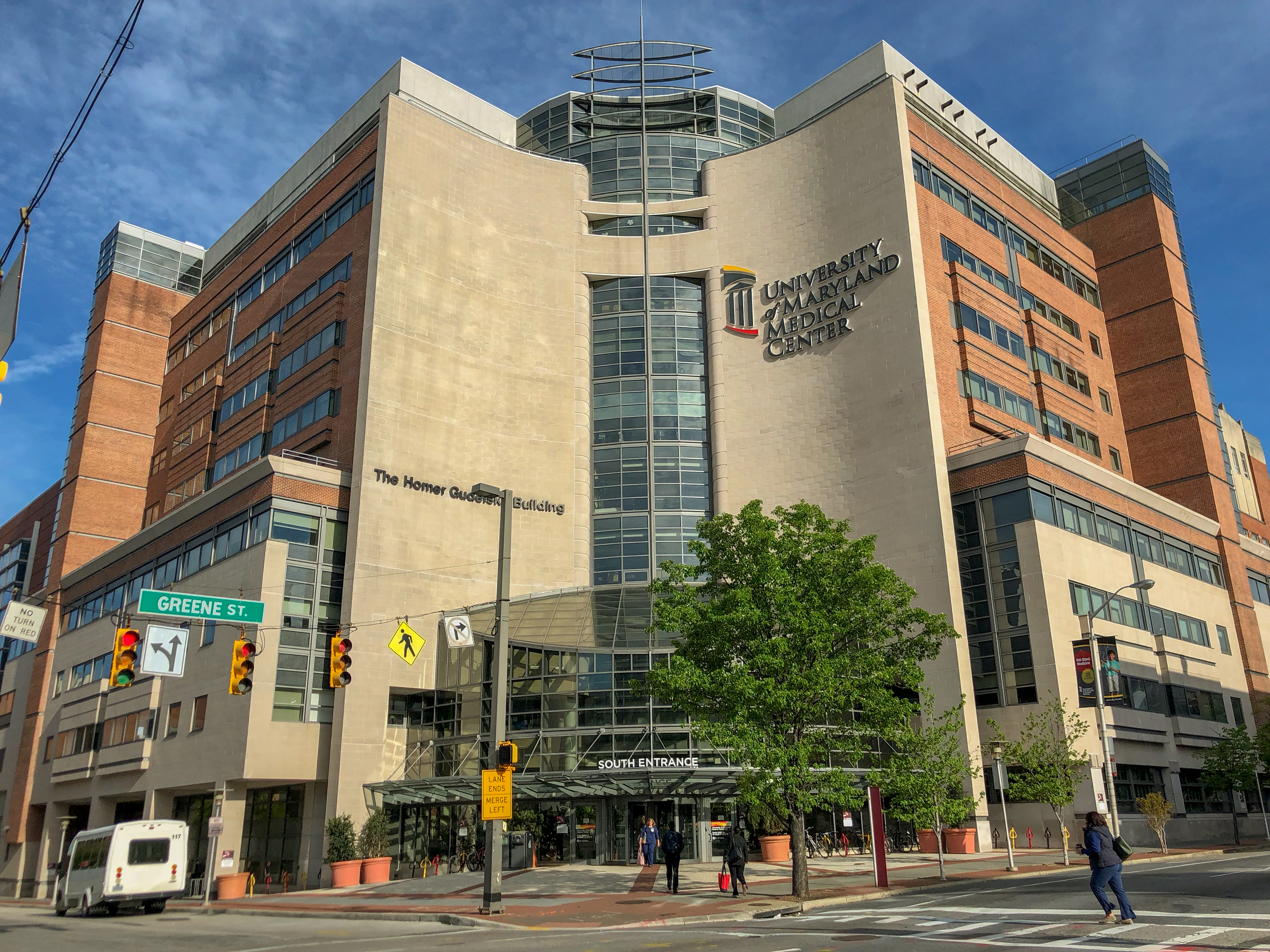
The University of Maryland Medical Center, the on-campus teaching hospital of the School of Medicine, and site of many of its clinical departments.

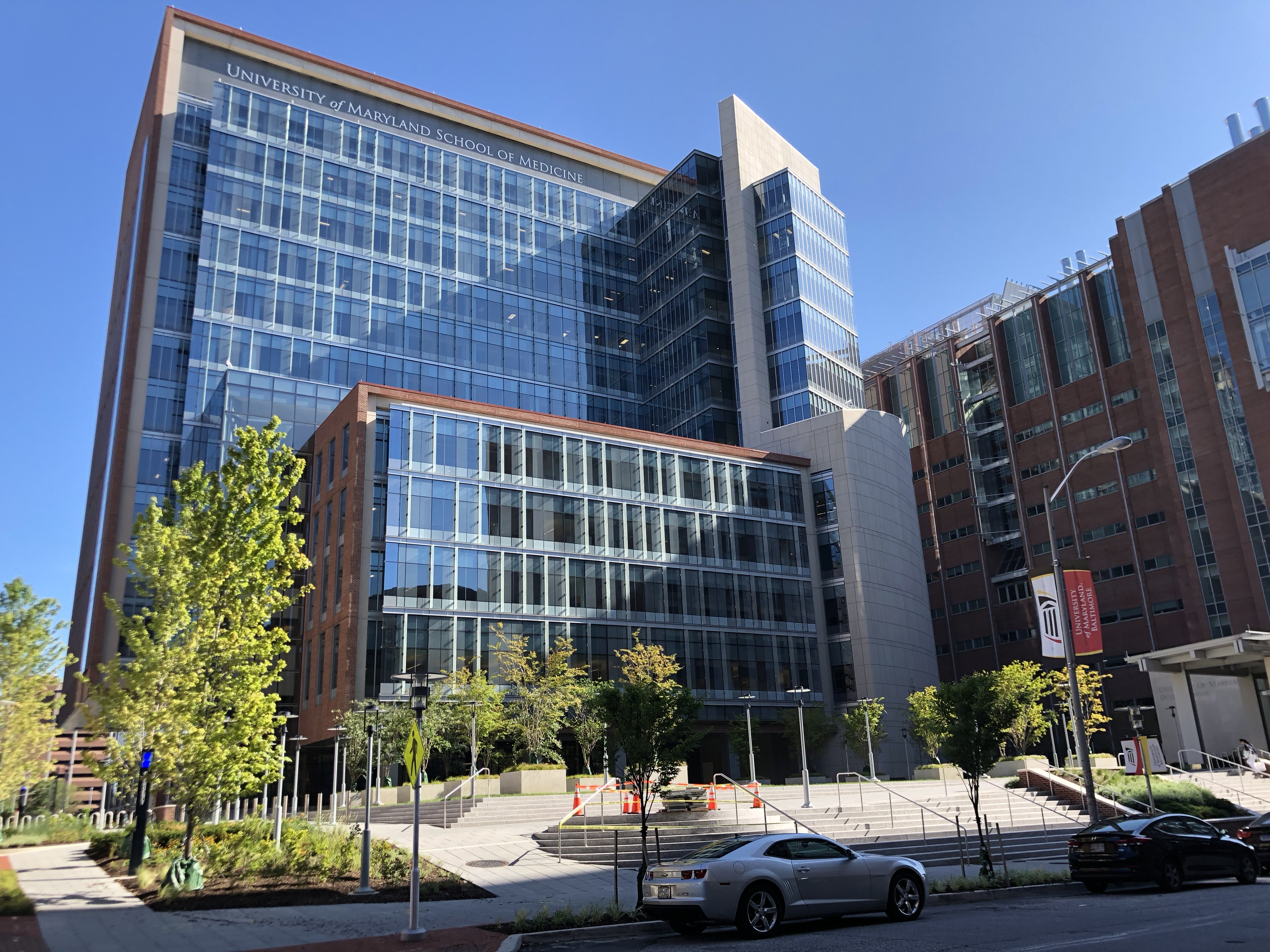
The Health Sciences Research Facility III building of the School of Medicine, housing labs dedicated to biomedical research.

=== Clinical ===
- Anesthesiology
- Dermatology
- Diagnostic Radiology and Nuclear Medicine
- Emergency Medicine
- Epidemiology and Public Health
- Family and Community Medicine
- Medicine
- Neurology
- Neurosurgery
- Obstetrics, Gynecology and Reproductive Sciences
- Ophthalmology and Visual Sciences
- Orthopaedics
- Otorhinolaryngology - Head and Neck Surgery
- Pathology
- Pediatrics
- Psychiatry
- Radiation Oncology
- Surgery

=== Basic Research ===
- Biochemistry and Molecular Biology
- Microbiology and Immunology
- Neurobiology
- Pharmacology and Physiology

=== Allied Health ===
- The Department of Medical and Research Technology (DMRT) offers a graduate program and a categorical certificate program and the School of Medicine's only undergraduate program. It is the largest accredited medical technology program in the state of Maryland.
- The Physical Therapy and Rehabilitation Science (PTRS) department, established in 1956, offers a Doctor of Physical Therapy (DPT) degree, which is a 3-year program, a PhD in rehabilitation sciences and a dual DPT/PhD program. In the 2010 edition of U.S. News & World Report physical therapy school rankings, UMB PTRS ranked 15th in the nation.

== Notable faculty ==
- Edward Brandt Jr., Professor (1981–1989), served as Surgeon General of the United States from 1981-1982.
- Angela Hartley Brodie, Professor in the Department of Pharmacology (1979–2017), pioneered the development of steroidal aromatase inhibitors.
- Robert Dorsey Coale, Professor and Dean (1857–1915) at chemistry and toxicology. Also volunteered in the Spanish–American War
- R Adams Cowley, Professor of Thoracic & Cardiovascular Surgery, founded the world's first Shock Trauma Center at the University of Maryland School of Medicine.
- Robley Dunglison, chair of materia medica, therapeutics, hygiene and medical jurisprudence (1833–1836), Thomas Jefferson's personal physician
- William A. Hammond, Chair of Anatomy and Physiology (1828–1900), the first American physician to devote himself entirely to neurology, Surgeon General of the United States Army during the American Civil War.
- Paul Fiset, microbiologist and developer of the Q fever vaccine
- Robert Gallo, Professor in the Department of Medicine (1996–), discovered the first human retrovirus, and that HIV was the cause of AIDS. He is the only scientist to be awarded the Lasker Award twice.
- Mark T. Gladwin, John Z. and Akiko K. Bowers distinguished professor and dean of the University of Maryland School of Medicine (2022–present)
- Hans Kuypers, Assistant Professor in the Department of Anatomy (1955–1962), neurologist famous for his work in neuroanatomy.
- Walle Nauta, Professor in the Department of Anatomy (1955–1964), considered one of the founders of the field of neuroscience.
- Frederick Ramsay, Associate Dean, later a mystery novelist.
- Robert R. Redfield, Professor in Translational Medicine (1996–2005), served as Director of the Centers for Disease Control and Prevention.
- Theodore Woodward, Professor of Medicine (1948–1981), received a Nobel Prize nomination for his role in finding cures for typhus and typhoid fever.

== Affiliated Hospitals ==
- University of Maryland Medical Center
- R Adams Cowley Shock Trauma Center
- University of Maryland Greenebaum Comprehensive Cancer Center
- Mercy Medical Center (Baltimore, Maryland)
- Spring Grove Hospital Center
- University of Maryland Baltimore Washington Medical Center
- University of Maryland Charles Regional Medical Center
- University of Maryland Rehabilitation & Orthopaedic Institute
- University of Maryland St. Joseph Medical Center
- University of Maryland Shore Medical Center
- University of Maryland Upper Chesapeake Medical Center
- Mt. Washington Pediatric Hospital (jointly with Johns Hopkins School of Medicine)

== See also ==
- College of Medicine of Maryland
