= Spring Grove Hospital Center =

Coordinates: 39°15′53″N 76°43′21″W

Geography
- Location: 55 Wade Ave, Catonsville, Maryland, United States

Organization
- Type: Psychiatric hospital
- Affiliated university: University of Maryland

Services
- Beds: 425

History
- Founded: 1797

Links
- Website: https://health.maryland.gov/springgrove/Pages/home.aspx
- Lists: Hospitals in Maryland

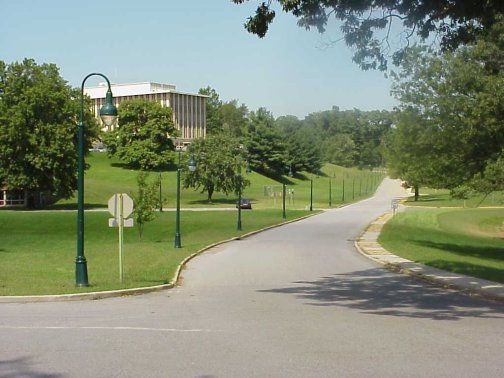
The Spring Grove campus as it appears today.

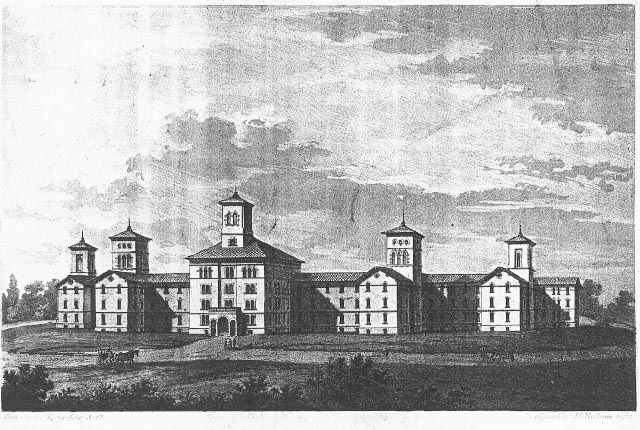
1853 architect's rendering of the proposed new buildings for the Maryland Hospital for the Insane at Spring Grove. Construction was completed in 1872, though the buildings were eventually demolished in 1963.

Spring Grove Hospital Center, formerly known as Spring Grove State Hospital, is a psychiatric hospital located in the Baltimore, Maryland, suburb of Catonsville.

Founded in 1797 as a general medical and psychiatric retreat, Spring Grove Mental Hospital is the second-oldest continuously operating psychiatric hospital in the United States. Today, the hospital operates 425 beds and has approximately 800 admissions and discharges a year. Service lines include adult and adolescent acute psychiatric admissions, long term inpatient care, medical-psychiatric hospitalization, forensic evaluation services, inpatient psychiatric research, and assisted living services. The land on which the hospital currently sits was transferred to the University of Maryland Baltimore County (UMBC) in May 2022. The hospital grounds are also the location of the Maryland Psychiatric Research Center which is renowned for its research into the causes of schizophrenia.

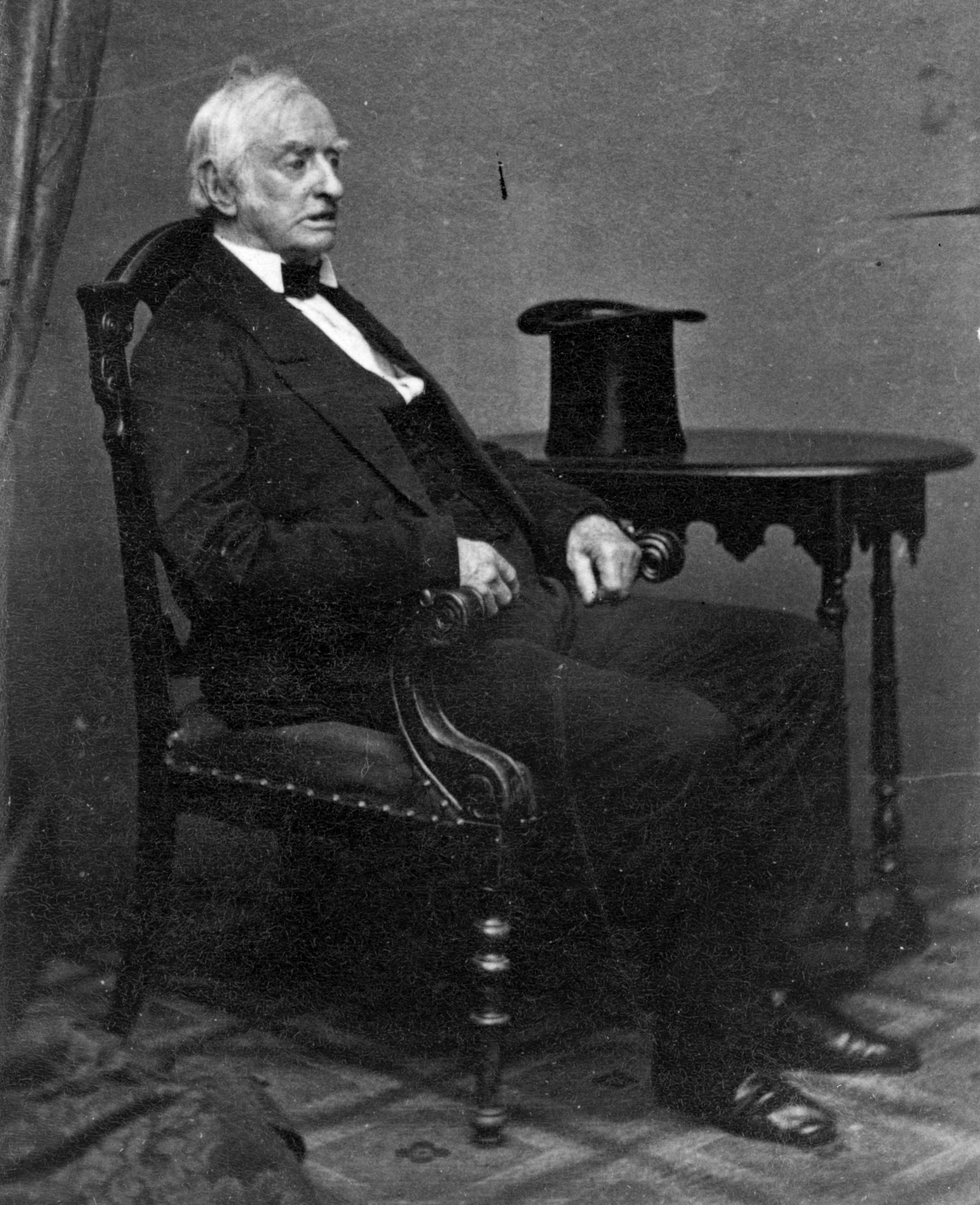
Richard Sprigg Steuart, who championed construction of the facility at Spring Grove.

== History ==
=== 18th Century ===
Founded in 1797, Spring Grove is the nation's second-oldest psychiatric hospital, though until recently operated as a medical and surgical hospital as well. Only the Eastern State Hospital which was founded in 1773 in Williamsburg, Virginia, is older. In its long history it has been variously known as The Baltimore Hospital, The Maryland Hospital, The Maryland Hospital for the Insane, and finally as The Spring Grove Hospital Center. It was originally built as a hospital to care for Yellow Fever for the indigent away from the city, as the Maryland Hospital. In 1840 the hospital expanded to exclusively care for the mentally ill. In 1873, the buildings were torn down as the facility relocated to Spring Hill. The original site is now home to the Johns Hopkins Bloomberg School of Public Health.

=== 19th Century ===
The present site was purchased in 1852 by which time the original buildings had become inadequate. Dr. Richard Sprigg Steuart, then President of the Board and Medical Superintendent, managed to obtain authorization and funding from the Maryland General Assembly for the construction of the new facility at Spring Grove. In co-operation with the social reformer Dorothea Dix, who in 1852 gave an impassioned speech to the Maryland legislature, Steuart chaired the committee that selected the hospital's present site in Catonsville, and he personally contributed $1,000 towards the purchase of the land.

The cost of purchasing 136 acres (55 ha) of land for the hospital was $14,000, of which $12,340 was raised through private contributions. The purchase was completed in 1853, but construction of the new buildings was delayed by the Civil War, and the hospital was not finally completed until 1872, when it was described by one contemporary as "one of the largest and best appointed Insane Asylums in the United States".

Steuart's brother, Major General George H. Steuart, had two sons who had mental illness, and it is possible that this was one of the causes of Steuart's particular interest in Spring Grove Hospital and the treatment of mental illness.

Steuart's building (known at various times as "The Main Building", "The Center Building" or "The Administration Building,") remained the main hospital facility for almost 100 years.

=== 20th Century ===
Steuart's buildings were demolished in 1963, replaced by more modern construction.

Starting in the 1960s and continuing into the 1970s, Spring Grove Hospital Center was the site of an extended research effort to understand potential therapeutic uses for lysergic acid diethylamide (LSD). Among the aspects studied as part of the Spring Grove Experiment were the potential for psychedelics to aid in recovering from alcoholism and heroin addiction, managing schizophrenia and neurosis, and supporting persons with terminal cancer.

== Future ==
In 2014, Baltimore County plans on subdividing the hospital campus in order to create an 8.8 acre regional park for the Catonsville community. Additional plans include expansion of the University of Maryland, Baltimore County campus south of Wilkens Avenue to the Spring Grove campus, where the university still has the rights to a portion of the property.

In May 2022, Governor Larry Hogan's administration proposed transferring the hospital campus to the University of Maryland, Baltimore County for $1. The Maryland Board of Public Works voted 2–1 to approve the sale of the campus, with Hogan and Treasurer Dereck E. Davis supporting the lease agreement and Comptroller Peter Franchot dissenting, on May 15, 2022.

== See also ==
- Spring Grove Experiment
