= Day at Night =

Television interview program

Day at Night was a public television interview program airing from 1973 to 1974, hosted by James Day, former president of both KQED and WNET. They are now available online via CUNY TV.

Interviewees include

- Alwyn Nikolais, choreographer - November 29, 1974
- Colleen Dewhurst, actress - June 6, 1974
- George Rose, actor - June 3, 1974
- William Schuman, composer - May 25, 1974
- Anne Baxter, actress - May 17, 1974
- Richard Rodgers, composer - May 13, 1974
- Edward Teller, nuclear physicist - May 8, 1974
- Marty Links, cartoonist ("EmmyLou") - May 8, 1974
- Archie Moore, boxer - May 6, 1974
- Tennessee Ernie Ford, singer - May 6, 1974
- Herbert Gold, novelist from the Beat Generation - May 3, 1974
- Jonas Salk, developer of the polio vaccine - April 28, 1974
- Christopher Isherwood, playwright - April 25, 1974
- Hugh Hefner, founder and publisher of Playboy - April 25, 1974
- Vincent Price, actor and horror star - April 25, 1974
- Irving Stone, novelist - April 23, 1974
- Joan Baez, singer-songwriter - April 20, 1974
- Wallace Stegner, author, historian, and environmentalist - April 18, 1974
- Jacob Bronowski, historian of science - April 9, 1974
- Noam Chomsky, author, lecturer, philosopher, and linguist - April 9, 1974
- Howard K. Smith, TV newscaster - April 5, 1974
- Sam Levenson, humorist and author - April 3, 1974
- Cab Calloway, singer and bandleader. - April 2, 1974
- S. J. Perelman, humorist and playwright - April 2, 1974
- Hermione Gingold, actress - March 29, 1974
- Alfred A. Knopf, publisher - March 28, 1974
- Irving Howe, author - March 28, 1974
- Kurt Waldheim, UN Secretary-General - March 22, 1974
- Virgil Thomson, composer - March 18, 1974
- Jan Peerce, opera singer. - March 15, 1974
- Marya Mannes, author ("They") - March 15, 1974
- Norman Cousins, author, journalist, peace advocate - March 12, 1974
- Art Buchwald, newspaper columnist - March 7, 1974
- Herbert Block, a.k.a. Herblock, political cartoonist. - February 28, 1974
- Muhammad Ali, legendary boxing champion - February 19, 1974
- Newton Minow, former chairman of the FCC - February 12, 1974
- Norman Lear, renowned TV producer ("All in the Family") - January 23, 1974
- Ray Bradbury, novelist and short story writer - January 21, 1974
- Ozzie Nelson, actor and director - January 21, 1974
- Stewart Alsop, newspaper columnist - January 1, 1974
- Aaron Copland, composer - December 20, 1973
- Theodore Bikel, actor - December 16, 1973
- Victor Borge, Danish comedian, conductor and pianist - December 5, 1973
- John Houseman, film and theatre producer, Part 1. - December 3, 1973
- Joseph Papp, theatrical producer and founder of the Public Theater. - November 29, 1973
- Jonathan Winters, actor/comedian - November 27, 1973
- Eli Wallach, actor/star of stage, screen and TV - November 20, 1973
- Abe Burrows, playwright and screenwriter. - November 13, 1973
- Billie Jean King, tennis champion - November 13, 1973
- Isaac Stern, classical violinist. - November 13, 1973
- Agnes De Mille, choreographer - June 25, 1973
- Katherine Anne Porter, novelist and short story writer - June 25, 1973
- Myrna Loy, actress - May 25, 1973
- Ayn Rand, writer
