= KQED Inc. =

Public broadcaster in the San Francisco Bay Area

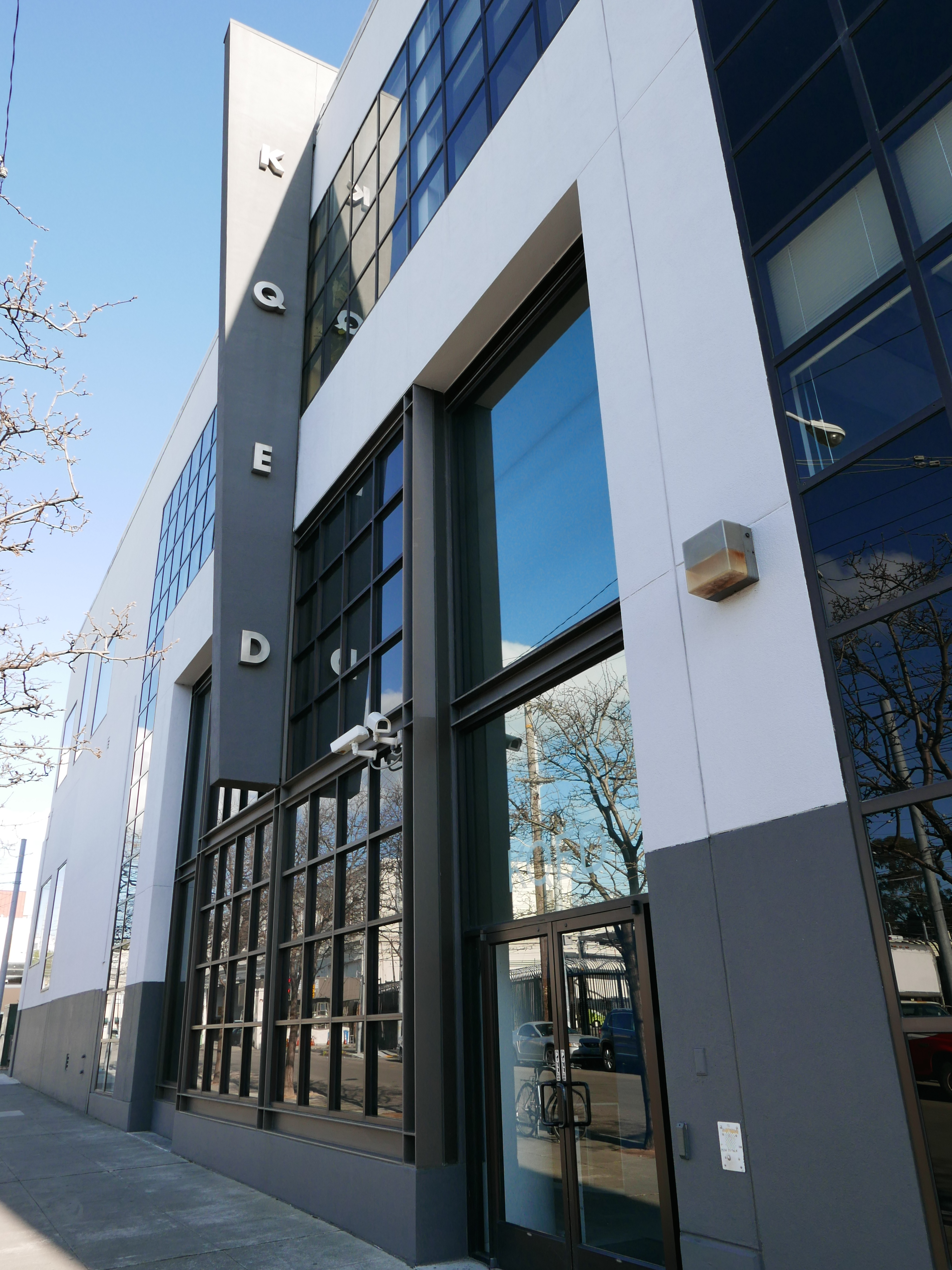
- The KQED headquarters on Mariposa Street in San Francisco before renovation.
- Formation: June 1, 1953; 73 years ago
- Type: Non-profit organization
- Tax ID no.: 94-1241309
- Headquarters: 2601 Mariposa Street; San Francisco, California; 94110
- Services: Public broadcasting
- Subsidiaries: KQED-FM, KQEI, KQED (TV), KQEH
- Revenue: US$115.1 million (2022)
- Staff: 545 (2022)
- Website: www.kqed.org
- Formerly called: Bay Area Educational Television Association (1953–1970); KQED, Inc. (1970–2006); Northern California Public Broadcasting (2006–2010)

KQED Inc. is a non-profit public media outlet based in the San Francisco Bay Area of California, which operates the radio station KQED-FM and the television stations KQED/KQET and KQEH. KQED's main headquarters are located in San Francisco, which was renovated in 2021. Improvements included a larger newsroom and studio, as well as a top floor outdoor terrace. The heart of the KQED headquarters is a 238-seat multipurpose event center called The Commons. The renovated venue hosts KQED Live, a series of lectures, concerts, discussions and other live events with entertainers, journalists, politicians, musicians, authors, chefs, and other guests. Reopening events for the public were postponed due to the COVID-19 pandemic. KQED is the Bay Area's most notable public broadcaster.

== History ==
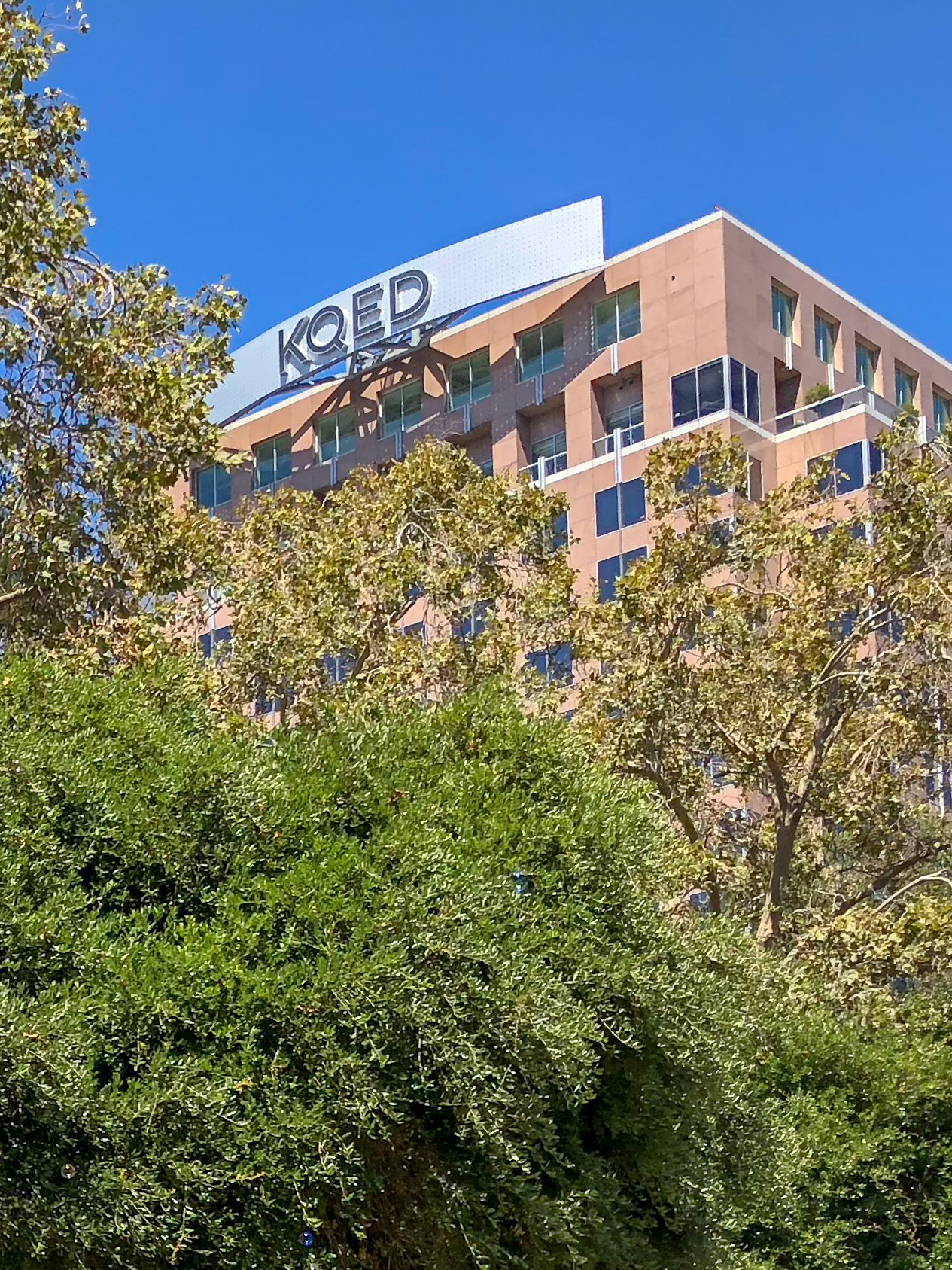
The KQED office on Plaza de San José in San Jose.

KQED was organized and created by veteran broadcast journalists James Day and Jonathan Rice on June 1, 1953 as the Bay Area Educational Television Association, and first went on air April 5, 1954. It was the sixth public broadcasting station in the United States, debuting shortly after WQED in Pittsburgh, Pennsylvania. The station's call letters, Q.E.D., are taken from the Latin phrase, quod erat demonstrandum, commonly used in mathematics. KQED-FM was founded by James Day in 1969 as the radio arm of KQED Television, and immediately became the first West Coast affiliate of National Public Radio prior to the network's launch in 1971.

On May 1, 2006, KQED, Inc. and the KTEH Foundation merged to form Northern California Public Broadcasting. The KQED assets including its television (KQED) and FM radio stations (KQED-FM) were taken under the umbrella of that new organization. Both remained members of Public Broadcasting Service (PBS) and National Public Radio (NPR), respectively. With this change, KQED and KTEH started operating as sister-stations. In October 2006, members gave up their right to vote on the Board of Directors, one of the few major organizations with that arrangement. The "Northern California" name did not become widely used, so in December 2010, the umbrella organization was renamed to "KQED, Inc.". KTEH changed its call letters to KQEH and rebranded as "KQED Plus" on July 1, 2011 after research found that most viewers were unaware that KTEH was affiliated with KQED.

== KQED public television ==
KQED is a PBS-member public television station in San Francisco, California, broadcasting digitally on UHF channel 30, and virtually on its analog-era channel 9. This channel is also carried on Comcast cable TV and via satellite by DirecTV and Dish Network. Its transmitter is located on Sutro Tower, and has studios based in San Francisco's Mission District.

== KQED public radio ==
KQED-FM (88.5) is an NPR-member radio station owned by KQED, Inc. in San Francisco, California.

As of 2013, KQED-FM was the most-listened-to public radio station in the nation according to Cision.

== See also ==
- Houchins v. KQED, Inc.
