= 2020 California Democratic primary =

2020 California Democratic primary may refer to:

- 2020 California Democratic presidential primary
- 2020 United States House of Representatives elections in California
