= 2020 California Democratic presidential primary =

- March 3, 2020

494 delegates (415 pledged, 79 unpledged) to the Democratic National Convention The number of pledged delegates won is determined by the popular vote

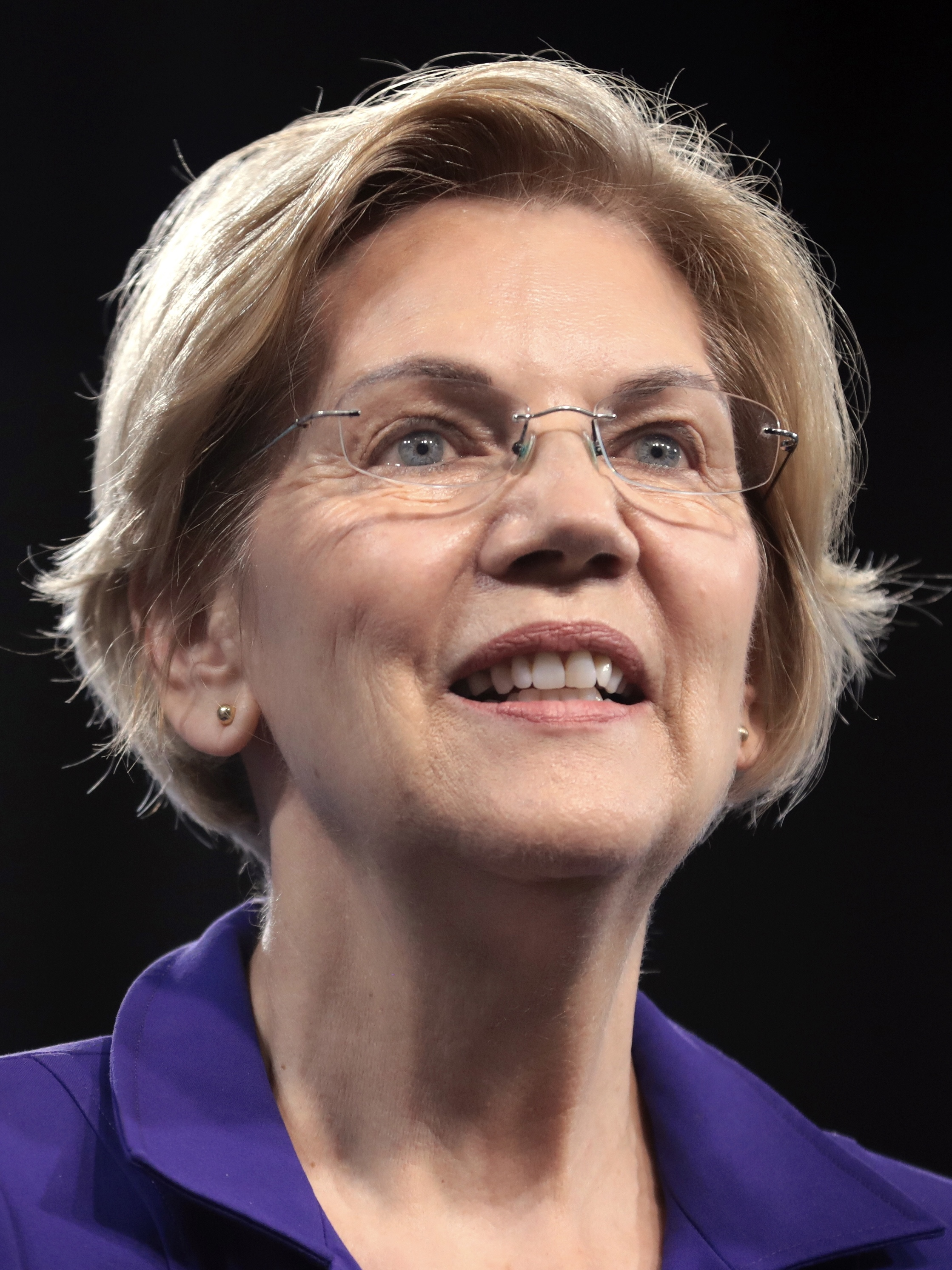

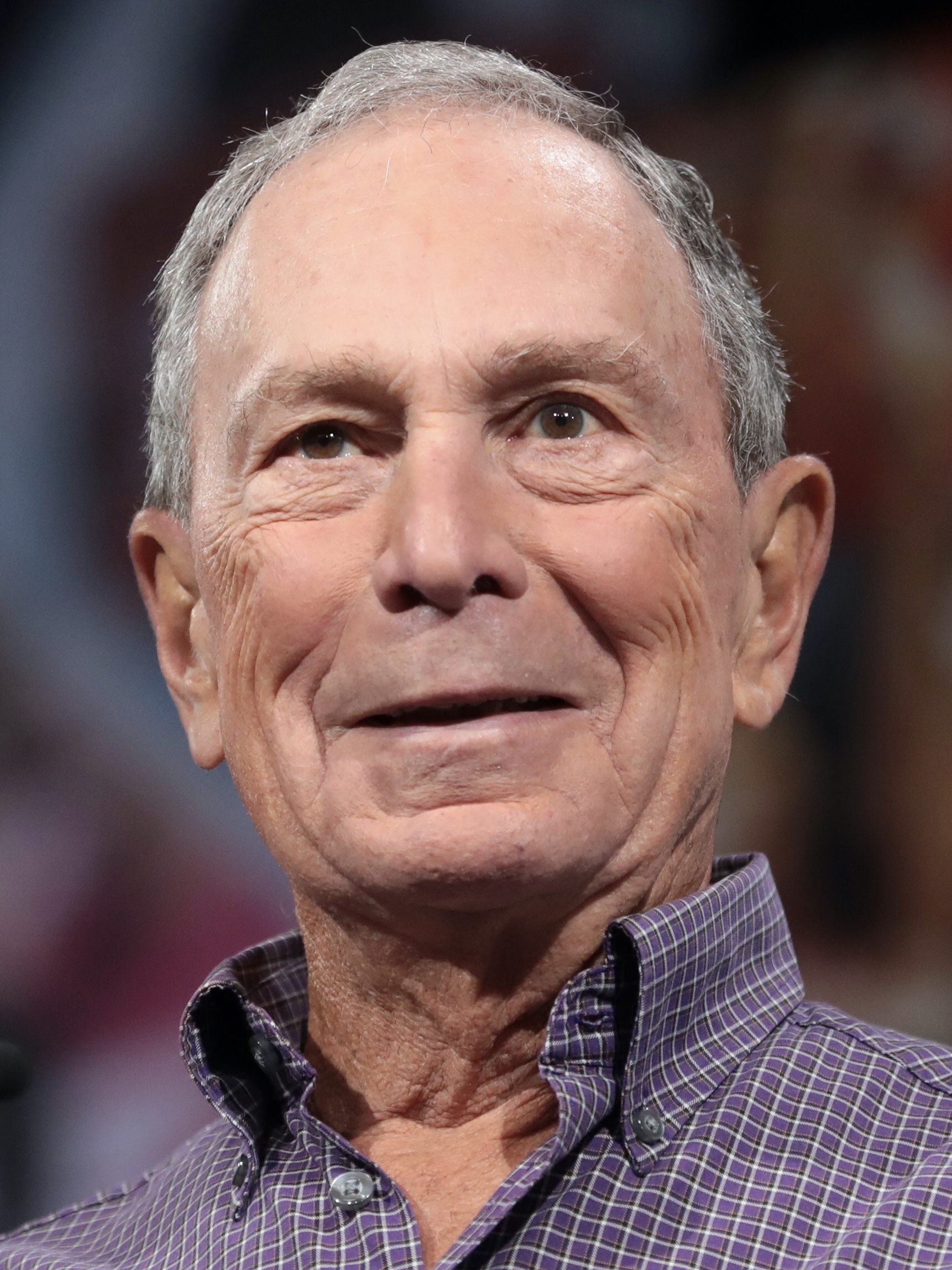
Candidate	Bernie Sanders	Joe Biden
Home state	Vermont	Delaware
Delegate count	225	172
Popular vote	2,080,846	1,613,854
Percentage	35.97%	27.90%
Candidate	Elizabeth Warren	Michael Bloomberg
Home state	Massachusetts	New York
Delegate count	11	7
Popular vote	762,555	701,803
Percentage	13.18%	12.13%

Sanders
<30%
30 – 40%
40 – 50%
50 – 60%
Biden
<30%
30 – 40%

The 2020 California Democratic presidential primary took place on March 3, 2020, as one of 15 contests scheduled on Super Tuesday in the Democratic Party primaries for the 2020 presidential election, following the South Carolina primary the weekend before. The California primary formed an unusual part of Super Tuesday as it had historically departed from its typical June date. It was a semi-closed primary, with the state awarding 494 delegates towards the 2020 Democratic National Convention, of which 415 were pledged delegates allocated on the basis of the results of the primary.

Senator Bernie Sanders won the highly desired primary, which bore the most delegates of the entire primary cycle by far, improving on his polling average by 3% and winning 36% of the vote and 225 delegates. Former vice president Joe Biden, however, aided by among others the endorsements of Pete Buttigieg and Amy Klobuchar, also had a much stronger second-place finish than expected and took 28% of the vote and 172 delegates, matching his successful Super Tuesday momentum and minimizing his delegate deficit, which was also leveled by his other wins on that day. Ultimately, his California loss did not hinder Biden from becoming the new frontrunner for the Democratic nomination. Elizabeth Warren and Michael Bloomberg did not surpass the 15% threshold and only got 11 and 7 delegates in a few districts, respectively.

== Procedure ==
California was one of 14 states and one territory that held its primaries on March 3, 2020, also known as "Super Tuesday", having joined other states on the date after the signing of the Prime Time Primary Act by Governor Jerry Brown on September 27, 2017, moving the primary from its traditional June date in an effort to increase the influence of the delegate-rich state in the nomination process.

Candidates were allowed to obtain ballot access in a number of ways. They needed to have.:

- "...qualified for funding under the Federal Election Campaign Act of 1974 (52 U.S.C. Sec. 30101, et seq.)
- appeared as a candidate in a national presidential debate hosted by a political party qualified to participate in a primary election, with at least two participating candidates, and publicly available for viewing by voters in more than one state during the current presidential election cycle. A "political party qualified to participate in a primary election" means any political party qualified in California, a major or minor-ballot qualified political party in another state, or a national committee of a political party recognized by the Federal Election Commission
- placed or qualified for placement on a presidential primary ballot or a caucus ballot of a major or minor ballot-qualified political party in at least one other state in the current presidential election cycle
- candidate or qualified to be a candidate in a caucus of a major or minor ballot-qualified political party in at least one other state in the current presidential election cycle
- has the following: current presidential campaign internet website or webpage hosted by the candidate or a qualified political party, and a written request submitted on the candidate's behalf by a party qualified to participate in the primary election to the Secretary of State requesting the candidate be placed on the presidential primary ballot."

If they did not have at least one of those qualifications, they needed to submit petitions of 500 signatures from each of the state's congressional districts obtained between November 4 and December 13, 2019. The official list of qualified candidates was released on December 6, 2019. Unqualified candidates were required to submit their petitions by this date.

Military and overseas mail-in ballots were sent out on January 3, 2020, and domestic mail-in ballots were requested and sent out from February 3 to February 25. Early voting centers opened for business on February 22 and continued until March 3. Election day voting took place throughout the state from 7 a.m. until 8 p.m. In the semi-closed primary, candidates had to meet a threshold of 15 percent at the congressional district or statewide level in order to be considered viable. The 415 pledged delegates to the 2020 Democratic National Convention were allocated proportionally on the basis of the results of the primary. Of these, between 4 and 7 were allocated to each of the state's 53 congressional districts, and another 54 were allocated to party leaders and elected officials (PLEO delegates), in addition to 90 at-large delegates. The Super Tuesday primary as part of Stage I on the primary timetable received no bonus delegates, in order to disperse the primaries between more different date clusters and keep too many states from hoarding on the first shared date or on a March date in general.

Following the primary, district-level delegates to the national convention were elected on June 7, 2020 (postponed from April 19 due to the COVID-19 pandemic) in the post-primary caucus. Should presidential candidates have been allocated more delegates based on the results of the primary than delegate candidates presented, then supplemental delegates would have been elected at caucuses on May 9, 2020. The national convention delegation meeting was subsequently held on June 28, 2020 (postponed from May 17) during the state convention, to vote on the 54 pledged PLEO and 90 at-large delegates for the Democratic National Convention. The delegation also included 79 unpledged PLEO delegates: 31 members of the Democratic National Committee, 47 members of Congress (both senators, including former candidate Kamala Harris, and 45 representatives, including former candidate Eric Swalwell), and the governor Gavin Newsom.

Pledged national convention delegates
Type	Del.	Type	Del.	Type	Del.	Type	Del.
CD1	4	CD14	6	CD27	5	CD40	5
CD2	6	CD15	6	CD28	6	CD41	5
CD3	5	CD16	4	CD29	5	CD42	5
CD4	5	CD17	5	CD30	6	CD43	5
CD5	6	CD18	6	CD31	5	CD44	5
CD6	5	CD19	6	CD32	5	CD45	5
CD7	5	CD20	5	CD33	6	CD46	4
CD8	4	CD21	4	CD34	5	CD47	5
CD9	5	CD22	4	CD35	5	CD48	5
CD10	4	CD23	4	CD36	4	CD49	5
CD11	6	CD24	5	CD37	6	CD50	4
CD12	7	CD25	5	CD38	5	CD51	5
CD13	7	CD26	5	CD39	5	CD52	6
PLEO		54	At-large		90	CD53	6
Total pledged delegates						415	

== Candidates ==
The following candidates appear in the Certified List of Statewide Candidates:

Running

- Joe Biden
- Michael Bloomberg
- Mosie Boyd
- Roque "Rocky" De La Fuente III
- Michael A. Ellinger
- Tulsi Gabbard
- Mark Stewart Greenstein
- Bernie Sanders
- Elizabeth Warren

Withdrawn

- Michael Bennet (Note: Candidate withdrew following the New Hampshire primary, when all-mail voting had already begun.)
- Cory Booker
- Pete Buttigieg (Note: Candidate withdrew shortly before the primary, when all-mail voting had already begun.)
- Julian Castro
- John Delaney
- Amy Klobuchar
- Deval Patrick
- Joe Sestak
- Tom Steyer
- Marianne Williamson
- Andrew Yang

== Polling ==
Polling aggregation
Source of poll aggregation	Date updated	Dates polled	Bernie Sanders	Joe Biden	Elizabeth Warren	Michael Bloomberg	Tulsi Gabbard	Other/ Undecided (Note: Calculated by taking the difference of 100% and all other candidates combined)
270 to Win	March 3, 2020	February 20 – March 1, 2020	33.0%	20.0%	14.4%	15.0%	1.2%	16.4%
RealClear Politics	March 3, 2020	February 28 – March 2, 2020	35.0%	23.0%	16.0%	14.0%	1.5%	10.5% (Note: includes Buttigieg with 6.0%; Klobuchar with 4.0%; Steyer not averaged)
FiveThirtyEight	March 3, 2020	until March 2, 2020 (Note: FiveThirtyEight aggregates polls with a trendline regression of polls rather than a strict average of recent polls.)	31.2%	21.7%	14.9%	14.7%	0.7%	16.8%
Average			33.1%	21.6%	15.1%	14.6%	1.1%	14.5%
California primary results (March 3, 2020)			36.0%	27.9%	13.2%	12.1%	0.6%	10.2%

Polling from January 1 to March 3, 2020
Poll source	Date(s) administered	Sample size (Note: Key: A – all adults RV – registered voters LV – likely voters V – unclear)	Margin of error	Joe Biden	Michael Bloomberg	Pete Buttigieg	Amy Klobuchar	Bernie Sanders	Tom Steyer	Elizabeth Warren	Andrew Yang	Other	Undecided
	March 2, 2020	Klobuchar withdraws from the race.											
Swayable	March 1–2, 2020	3,388 (LV)	± 2.0%	20.8%	19.3%	8.4%	3.3%	28.7%	4.0%	9.6%	–	6.0% (Note: Gabbard with 0.1%; "Other" with 5.9%)	–
Data for Progress	February 28 – March 2, 2020	516 (LV)	± 4.3%	25%	17%	5%	3%	32%	–	16%	–	1% (Note: Gabbard with 1%)	–
AtlasIntel	February 24 – March 2, 2020	727 (LV)	± 4.0%	26%	15%	3%	1%	34%	–	15%	–	2% (Note: Gabbard with 1%; "Other" with 1%)	4%
	March 1, 2020	Buttigieg withdraws from the race.											
Point Blank Political	February 29 – March 1, 2020	1,220 (LV)	± 4.1%	22%	10%	6%	3%	34%	1%	14%	–	1% (Note: Gabbard with 1%)	9%
Emerson College/Nexstar	February 29 – March 1, 2020	545 (LV)	± 4.1%	21%	11%	7%	5%	38%	2%	16%	–	1% (Note: Gabbard with 1%)	–
	February 29, 2020	South Carolina primary; Steyer withdraws from the race after close of polls.											
YouGov/CBS News	February 27–29, 2020	1,411 (LV)	± 4.0%	19%	12%	9%	4%	31%	3%	18%	–	4% (Note: Gabbard with 1%; "Someone else" with 3%)	–
Suffolk University	February 26–29, 2020	500 (LV)	± 4.4%	14%	16%	7%	5%	35%	3%	12%	–	3% (Note: Gabbard with 3%)	–
YouGov/Hoover; Institution/Stanford University	February 26–28, 2020	1,020 (LV)	–	19%	13%	9%	6%	28%	4%	18%	–	3% (Note: Gabbard with 3%)	–
Point Blank Political	February 26–28, 2020	2,276 (LV)	± 2.9%	14%	12%	9%	3%	34%	3%	14%	–	1% (Note: Gabbard with 1%)	10%
Point Blank Political	February 26–28, 2020	2,276 (LV)	± 2.9%	40% (Note: If only the two candidates for which percentages are listed could be voted for)	–	–	–	50%	–	–	–	–	11%
Point Blank Political	February 26–28, 2020	2,276 (LV)	± 2.9%	–	32% (Note: If only the two candidates for which percentages are listed could be voted for)	–	–	57%	–	–	–	–	11%
Point Blank Political	February 26–28, 2020	2,276 (LV)	± 2.9%	–	–	–	–	46% (Note: If only the two candidates for which percentages are listed could be voted for)	–	36%	–	–	16%
CNN/SSRS	February 22–26, 2020	488 (LV)	± 5.2%	13%	12%	7%	6%	35%	3%	14%	–	3% (Note: Gabbard with 1%; "Someone else" with 0%; "None/No one" with 2%)	8%
	February 25, 2020	Tenth Democratic primary debate											
Point Blank Political	February 23–25, 2020	2,098 (LV)	± 3.0%	11%	11%	9%	4%	34%	3%	13%	–	2% (Note: Gabbard with 2%)	13%
Berkeley IGS/LA Times	Feb 20–25, 2020	3,002 (LV)	± 2.0%	8%	12%	11%	6%	34%	2%	17%	1%	2% (Note: Gabbard with 1%; "Others" with 1%)	7%
	February 22, 2020	Nevada caucuses											
Change Research/KQED News	February 20–23, 2020	1,069 (LV)	± 3.4%	12%	6%	11%	5%	37%	3%	20%	4% (Note: Included in poll despite being withdrawn because he is still on the ballot.)	3% (Note: Gabbard with 2%; Castro with 1%; Bennet, Williamson, Patrick, Sestak, Delaney, Greenstein, Ellinger, Boyd, and De La Fuente with 0%)	–
University of Massachusetts Lowell	February 12–20, 2020	450 (LV)	± 6.7%	13%	12%	12%	7%	24%	2%	16%	–	7% (Note: Gabbard with 4%; "Another candidate" with 3%)	6%
Monmouth University	February 16–19, 2020	408 (LV)	± 4.9%	17%	13%	9%	4%	24%	5%	10%	–	3% (Note: Gabbard with 2%; "Other" with 1%)	13%
Monmouth University	February 16–19, 2020	408 (LV)	± 4.9%	36% (Note: If only the two candidates for which percentages are listed could be voted for)	–	–	–	44%	–	–	–	15% (Note: "Already voted" with 10%; "neither" with 5%)	5%
Monmouth University	February 16–19, 2020	408 (LV)	± 4.9%	–	31% (Note: If only the two candidates for which percentages are listed could be voted for)	–	–	48%	–	–	–	14% (Note: "Already voted" with 10%; "neither" with 4%)	6%
Monmouth University	February 16–19, 2020	408 (LV)	± 4.9%	–	–	26% (Note: If only the two candidates for which percentages are listed could be voted for)	–	51%	–	–	–	16% (Note: "Already voted" with 10%; "neither" with 6%)	7%
Monmouth University	February 16–19, 2020	408 (LV)	± 4.9%	–	–	–	24% (Note: If only the two candidates for which percentages are listed could be voted for)	54%	–	–	–	16% (Note: "Already voted" with 10%; "neither" with 6%)	6%
Public Policy Institute of California	February 7–17, 2020	573 (LV)	± 5.7%	14%	12%	12%	5%	32%	3%	13%	–	2% (Note: Tulsi Gabbard 1%; someone else 1%)	8%
SurveyUSA	February 13–16, 2020	520 (LV)	± 4.8%	15%	21%	12%	6%	25%	3%	9%	–	1% (Note: "Some other Democrat" with 1%)	9%
YouGov/USC	February 1–15, 2020	–	–	21%	8%	6%	3%	29%	2%	20%	–	2% (Note: Gabbard with 2%)	9% (Note: "someone else/skipped")
	February 11, 2020	New Hampshire primary; Yang withdraws from the race after close of polls.											
Capitol Weekly	February 6–9, 2020	843 (LV)	–	8% (Note: Answers listed in this row are for the question, "If electability wasn't a concern, who would you support?")	8%	15%	7%	25%	4%	19%	5%	6% (Note: Gabbard with 3%; Booker with 2%; Williamson with 1%; Patrick with 0%)	3% (Note: Listed as "no response")
Capitol Weekly	February 6–9, 2020	843 (LV)	–	11%	13%	14%	5%	29%	3%	16%	4%	5% (Note: Gabbard with 3%; Booker, Patrick and Williamson with 1%; Delaney with 0%)	1% (Note: Listed as "no response")
	February 3, 2020	Iowa Caucuses											
Change Research/KQED News	January 25–27, 2020	1,967 (LV)	–	15%	4%	8%	3%	30%	2%	16%	5%	4% (Note: Gabbard with 4%; Bennet, Delaney and Patrick with <1%)	13%
Berkeley IGS/LA Times	January 15–21, 2020	2,895 (LV)	± 2.5%	15.0%	6.0%	7.2%	4.9%	26.3%	1.8%	19.6%	3.9%	3.6% (Note: Gabbard with 1.4%; Bennet with 0.9%; Booker with 0.8%; "All others" with 0.5%)	11.7%
SurveyUSA	January 14–16, 2020	565 (LV)	± 5.1%	30%	6%	8%	2%	20%	4%	20%	4%	2% (Note: Gabbard with 2%; others with 0%)	4%
	January 13, 2020	Booker withdraws from the race.											
Public Policy Institute of California/Mercury News	January 3–12, 2020	530 (LV)	± 6.5%	24%	1%	6%	4%	27%	–	23%	3%	5% (Note: someone else (included Bloomberg) 6%)	7%
Tulchin Research/USC Rossier/The Hill	January 3–10, 2020	1,121 (LV)	–	25%	7%	8%	2%	29%	3%	12%	5%	2% (Note: Booker and "someone else" with 1%)	6%
Capitol Weekly	January 1–9, 2020	1,053 (LV)	–	20%	6%	11%	5%	24%	2%	21%	7%	3% (Note: Gabbard with 2%; Booker with 1%; Delaney, Patrick and Williamson with 0%; no response with 0%)	–

Polling before 1 January 2020
Poll source	Date(s) administered	Sample size	Margin of error	Joe Biden	Cory Booker	Pete Buttigieg	Kamala Harris	Beto O'Rourke	Bernie Sanders	Elizabeth Warren	Andrew Yang	Other	Undecided
Change Research/KQED News	December 6–10, 2019	862 (LV)	± 3.3%	19%	3%	12%	–	–	26%	23%	4%	13% (Note: Bloomberg, Castro and Gabbard with 3%; Steyer with 2%; Klobuchar and Williamson with 1%; Bennet, Delaney and Patrick with 0%)	–
CNN/SSRS	December 4–8, 2019	508 (LV)	± 5.2%	21%	3%	9%	–	–	20%	17%	6%	12% (Note: Bloomberg with 5%; Gabbard and Klobuchar with 2%; Castro and Steyer with 1%; Bennet, Delaney, Patrick, and Williamson with 0%; "None/No one" with 1%)	11%
Capitol Weekly	December 3–7, 2019	581 (LV)	– (Note: The top row presents results which exclude Kamala Harris as an option.)	19%	2%	14%	–	–	19%	23%	5%	17% (Note: Bloomberg with 5%; Gabbard and Klobuchar with 4%; Castro with 2%; Steyer and Williamson with 1%; Delaney and Patrick with 0%)	1%
Capitol Weekly	December 3–7, 2019	581 (LV)	–	19%	2%	13%	4%	–	19%	21%	5%	17% (Note: Bloomberg with 5%; Gabbard and Klobuchar with 4%; Castro, Steyer and Williamson with 1%; Delaney with 0%; Patrick with no voters)	0%
	December 3, 2019	Harris withdraws from the race.											
Berkeley IGS/LA Times	November 21–27, 2019	1,252 (LV)	–	14%	1%	12%	7%	–	24%	22%	3%	12% (Note: Klobuchar with 3%; Bloomberg with 2%; Bennet, Castro, Gabbard, Steyer with 1%, Bullock, Delaney, Patrick, Sestak and Williamson with 0%)	9%
SurveyUSA	November 20–22, 2019	558 (LV)	± 4.8%	28%	3%	8%	10%	–	18%	13%	5%	11% (Note: Bloomberg and Steyer with 3%; Gabbard with 2%; Castro and Klobuchar with 1%; Patrick with 0%; others with 1%)	5%
Capitol Weekly	November 1–12, 2019	695 (LV)	–	18%	1%	14%	6%	–	21%	27%	4%	8% (Note: Gabbard and Klobuchar with 3%; Steyer and Williamson with 1%; Castro and Delaney with 0%)	1%
Public Policy Institute of California	November 3–12, 2019	682 (LV)	–	24%	1%	7%	8%	–	17%	23%	5%	6% (Note: Klobuchar and Steyer with 1%; other with 4%)	9%
	November 1, 2019	O'Rourke withdraws from the race.											
Change Research	October 15–18, 2019	1,631 (LV)	–	19%	1%	9%	8%	1%	24%	28%	3%	6% (Note: Gabbard and Klobuchar with 2%; Steyer and Williamson with 1%; Bennet, Bullock, Castro, Delaney, Messam, Ryan, and Sestak with 0%)	–
SurveyUSA	October 15–16, 2019	553 (LV)	± 6.9%	33%	2%	4%	8%	2%	17%	18%	4%	5% (Note: Castro, Gabbard, Klobuchar, Steyer, and some other Democrat with 1%)	8%
Capitol Weekly	October 1–14, 2019	590 (LV)	–	21%	2%	6%	8%	0%	15%	35%	3%	9% (Note: Castro and Gabbard with 2%; Klobuchar, Steyer and Williamson with 1%; de Blasio and Ryan with 0%; no response with 2%)	–
Public Policy Institute of California	September 16–25, 2019	692 (LV)	± 4.9%	22%	2%	6%	8%	1%	21%	23%	3%	7% (Note: Castro with 2%; Klobuchar and Steyer with 1%; someone else with 3%)	9%
Berkeley IGS/LA Times	September 13–18, 2019	2,272	–	20%	1%	6%	8%	3%	19%	29%	2%	5% (Note: Klobuchar with 2%; Bennet, Castro and Gabbard with 1%; Bullock, de Blasio, Delaney, Messam, Ryan, Sestak, Steyer and Williamson with 0%;)	8%
Emerson College	September 13–16, 2019	424	± 4.7%	26%	1%	4%	6%	5%	26%	20%	7%	4% (Note: Gabbard with 2%; Castro and Steyer with 1%; Bennet, de Blasio, Bullock, Delaney, Klobuchar, Messam, Ryan, Sestak and Williamson with 0%; someone else with 1%)	–
SurveyUSA	September 13–15, 2019	547	± 4.8%	27%	2%	3%	13%	2%	18%	16%	7%	4% (Note: Castro with 2%; Klobuchar with 1%; someone else with 1%)	7%
Change Research/KQED	September 12–15, 2019	3,325	± 1.7%	18%	2%	10%	11%	2%	23%	25%	3%	5% (Note: Gabbard with 2%; Castro, Klobuchar and Williamson with 1%; Bennet, de Blasio, Bullock, Delaney, Messam, Ryan, Sestak and Steyer with 0%)	–
Capitol Weekly	September 1–13, 2019	599	–	18%	1%	7%	11%	2%	21%	29%	4%	5% (Note: Gabbard with 2%; Castro, Klobuchar and Williamson with 1%; Steyer with 0%)	–
Capitol Weekly	September 1–13, 2019	5,510	–	18%	1%	8%	11%	2%	17%	33%	3%	7% (Note: Gabbard with 3%; Castro, Klobuchar, Steyer and Williamson with 1%; Bennet, Bullock, de Blasio, Delaney and Ryan with 0%)	–
SurveyUSA	August 1–5, 2019	528	± 6.3%	25%	1%	6%	17%	0%	18%	21%	1%	1% (Note: Gabbard with 1%)	10%
PPIC	July 14–23, 2019	766	± 4.4%	11%	–	5%	19%	–	12%	15%	–	14% (Note: "Anyone" with 2%; "None of them" with 5%; "Others" with 7%)	25%
YouGov/CBS News	July 9–18, 2019	1,514	± 2.9%	24%	1%	6%	23%	1%	16%	19%	1%	9% (Note: Bennet, Castro, Gabbard, Gravel, Klobuchar, Steyer, Williamson with 1%; Bullock, de Blasio, Delaney, Gillibrand, Hickenlooper, Inslee, Messam, Moulton, Ryan, and Sestak with 0%)	–
Quinnipiac University	July 10–15, 2019	519	± 5.7%	21%	1%	3%	23%	1%	18%	16%	2%	2% (Note: Castro and Inslee with 1%; Bennet, Bullock, de Blasio, Delaney, Gabbard, Gillibrand, Gravel, Hickenlooper, Klobuchar, Messam, Moulton, Ryan, Sestak, Steyer, and Williamson with <1%, others with <1%)	10%
Capitol Weekly	July 1–15, 2019	816	–	20%	1%	8%	20%	2%	16%	25%	1%	7% (Note: Castro, Gabbard, Gillibrand, Inslee, Klobuchar, & Williamson with 1%; Bennet, Bullock, de Blasio, Delaney, Hickenlooper, Ryan, Swalwell & Steyer with 0%)	–
Change Research	July 9–11, 2019	1,609	± 2.5%	17%	1%	8%	23%	2%	20%	22%	2%	5% (Note: Gabbard with 2%; Castro, Klobuchar & Inslee with 1%; Bennet, de Blasio, Delaney, Gillibrand, Gravel, Hickenlooper, Messam, Ryan, Sestak, Steyer & Williamson with 0%)	–
	July 8, 2019	Swalwell withdraws from the race.											
Capitol Weekly	June 1–30, 2019	813	–	23%	2%	8%	14%	2%	19%	23%	2%	9% (Note: Gabbard & Hickenlooper with 2%; Bennet, Gillibrand & Klobuchar with 1%; Bullock, Castro, de Blasio, Delaney, Inslee, Moulton, Ryan & Williamson with 0%)	–
UC Berkeley	June 4–10, 2019	2,131	± 3.0%	22%	1%	10%	13%	3%	17%	18%	1%	3% (Note: Castro and Klobuchar with 1%; Bullock, Delaney, Gillibrand, Hickenlooper, Inslee, Ryan, Swalwell, and Williamson with 0%)	11%
Capitol Weekly	May 1–31, 2019	1,180	–	29%	2%	9%	17%	4%	22%	11%	0%	6% (Note: Castro, Gillibrand, Hickenlooper, Klobuchar, Ryan & Swalwell with 1%; Bullock, de Blasio, Gabbard, Inslee & Williamson with 0%)	–
Change Research	May 25–28, 2019	1,649	± 2.4%	30%	1%	12%	15%	3%	23%	12%	1%	2% (Note: Castro and Gabbard with 1%; Abrams, Bennet, Gillibrand, Gravel, Hickenlooper, Klobuchar, Inslee, Moulton, Ryan, Swalwell, and Williamson with 0%)	–
Capitol Weekly	April 15–30, 2019	1,204	–	20%	2%	19%	17%	4%	20%	10%	–	9% (Note: Klobuchar with 3%; Inslee with 2%; Gillibrand, Hickenlooper, Ryan & Swalwell with 1%; Castro with 0%)	–
	April 25, 2019	Biden announces his candidacy.											
	April 14, 2019	Buttigieg announces his candidacy.											
Change Research	April 6–9, 2019	2,003	± 2.2%	21%	3%	9%	19%	10%	22%	8%	1%	7% (Note: Castro with 2%; Abrams, Gabbard, Inslee, Klobuchar, and Swalwell with 1%; Bennet, Delaney, Gillibrand, Hickenlooper, Messam, Ryan, and Williamson with 0%)	–
Change Research	April 6–9, 2019	2,003	± 2.2%	–	5%	11%	27%	16%	28%	9%	1%	5% (Note: Castro with 2%; Gabbard, Klobuchar, and Ryan with 1%; Delaney, Gillibrand, Hickenlooper, Inslee, Messam, and Williamson with 0%)	–
	April 8, 2019	Swalwell announces his candidacy.											
Quinnipiac University	April 3–8, 2019	482	± 5.9%	26%	2%	7%	17%	4%	18%	7%	1%	6% (Note: Castro and Klobuchar with 2%; Gabbard and Inslee with 1%; Delaney, Gillibrand, Hickenlooper, Messam, and Williamson with <1%; others with <1%)	13%
	March 14, 2019	O'Rourke announces his candidacy.											
	February 19, 2019	Sanders announces his candidacy.											
Change Research	February 9–11, 2019	948	–	26%	3%	1%	26%	8%	20%	7%	0%	7% (Note: Castro with 2%; Brown, Gabbard, Gillibrand, Holder, and Klobuchar with 1%; Bloomberg, Bullock, Cuomo, Delaney, Hickenlooper, Inslee, Swalwell, and Williamson with 0%)	–
Change Research	February 9–11, 2019	948	–	–	7%	2%	53%	–	–	23%	1%	15% (Note: Castro with 6%; Gabbard with 4%; Delaney and Gillibrand with 2%; Williamson with 1%)	–

== Results ==
2020 California Democratic presidential primary
Candidate	Votes	%	Delegates
Bernie Sanders	2,080,846	35.97	225
Joe Biden	1,613,854	27.90	172
Elizabeth Warren	762,555	13.18	11
Michael Bloomberg	701,803	12.13	7
Pete Buttigieg (withdrawn)	249,256	4.31	
Amy Klobuchar (withdrawn)	126,961	2.19	
Tom Steyer (withdrawn)	113,092	1.96	
Andrew Yang (withdrawn)	43,571	0.75	
Tulsi Gabbard	33,769	0.58	
Julian Castro (withdrawn)	13,892	0.24	
Michael Bennet (withdrawn)	7,377	0.13	
Marianne Williamson (withdrawn)	7,052	0.12	
Cory Booker (withdrawn)	6,000	0.10	
John Delaney (withdrawn)	4,606	0.08	
Joe Sestak (withdrawn)	3,270	0.06	
Deval Patrick (withdrawn)	2,022	0.03	
Other candidates / Write-in	(Note: Including 34 write-in votes)14,438	0.25	
Total	5,784,364	100%	415

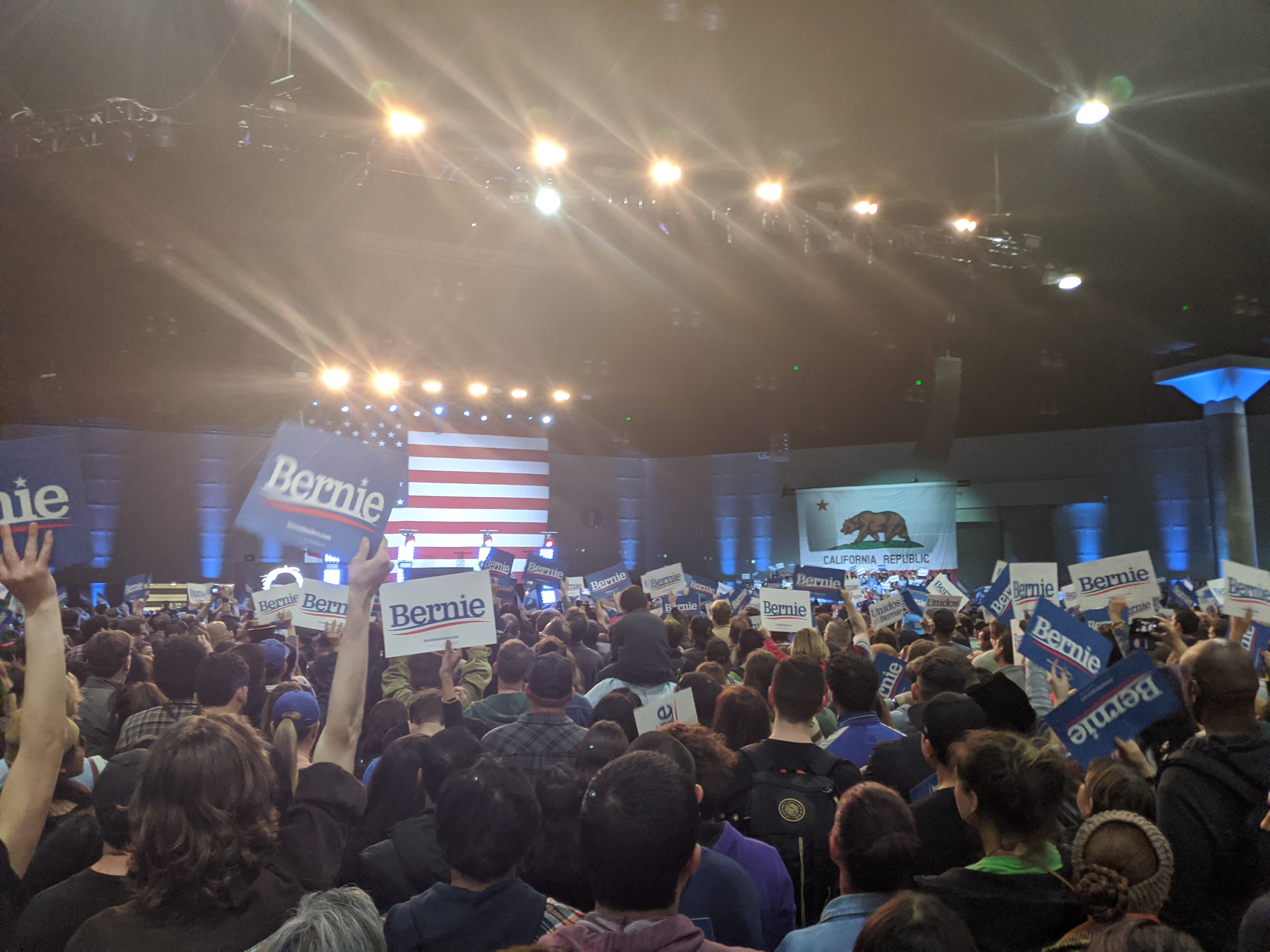
Bernie Sanders rally at the Los Angeles Convention Center

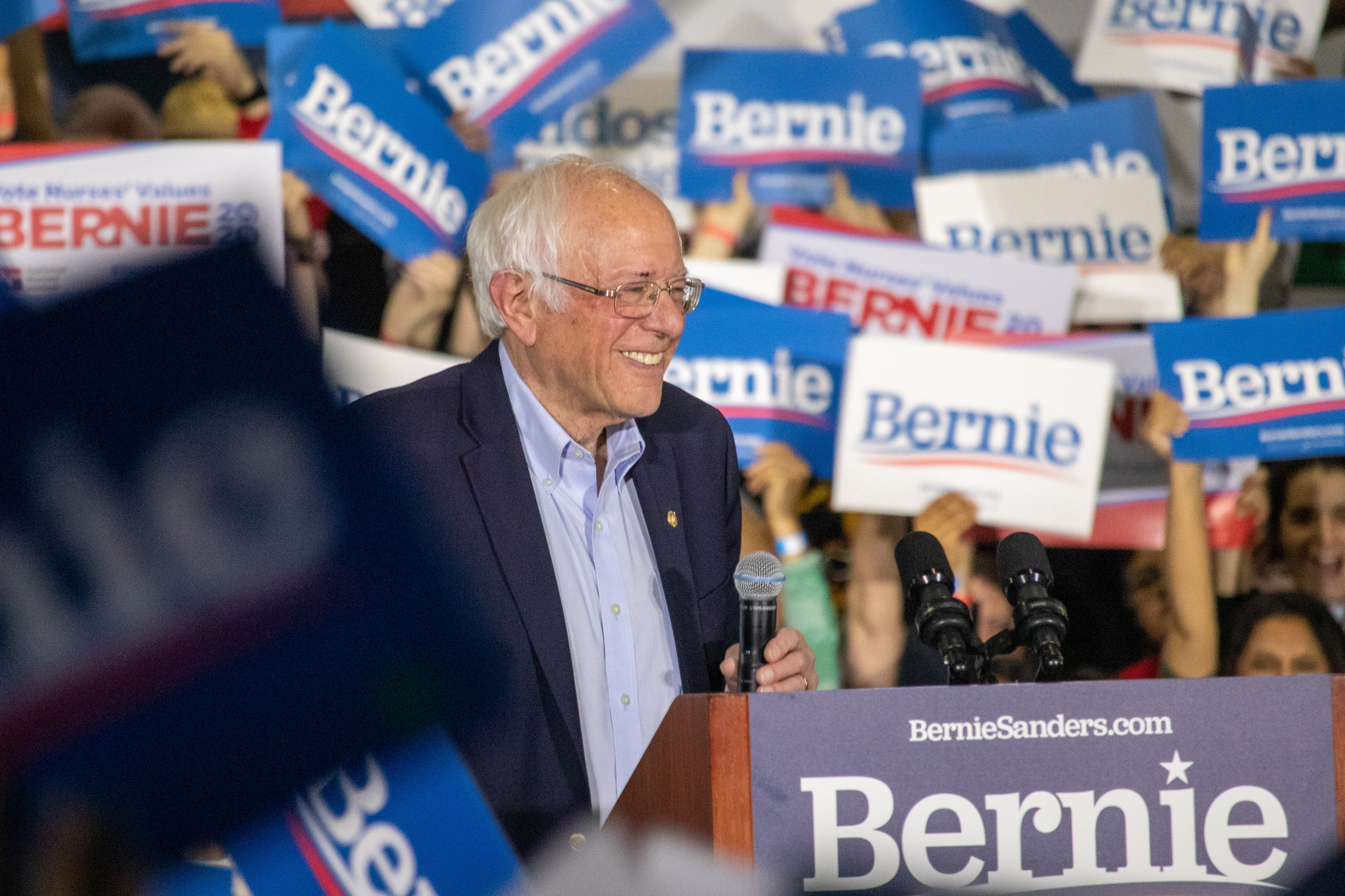
Senator Bernie Sanders at a campaign rally in San Jose on March 1, 2020

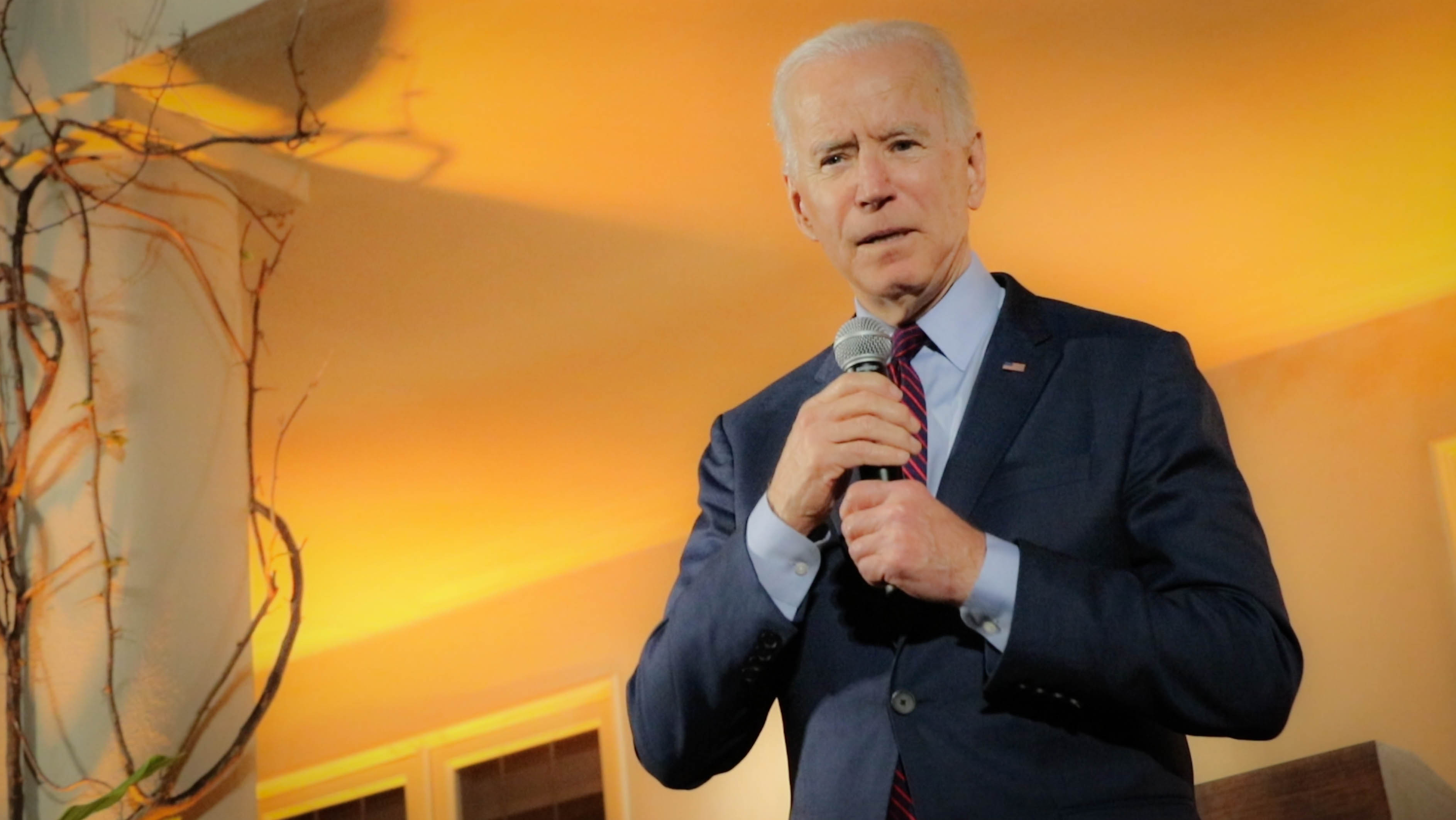
Joe Biden's presidential campaign in Bel Air, Los Angeles, on March 5, 2020

Votes (percentage) and delegates by district
District	Bernie Sanders		Joe Biden		Michael Bloomberg		Elizabeth Warren		Total delegates	District region	Largest city
1st	34%	2	23.7%	2	10.3%	0	12.9%	0	4	Shasta Cascade	Chico, Redding
2nd	33.3%	3	25.3%	2	13.5%	0	15.9%	1	6	North Coast	Eureka
3rd	34.3%	3	29.3%	2	12%	0	12%	0	5	Sacramento Valley	Fairfield
4th	26.1%	2	29.6%	3	14.7%	0	11.4%	0	5	Sierras	Roseville
5th	32.7%	3	27.2%	3	14.9%	0	12.6%	0	6	Wine Country	Santa Rosa
6th	35.8%	3	28.1%	2	10.7%	0	14.3%	0	5	Sacramento Valley	Sacramento
7th	30.9%	2	31.4%	3	13%	0	11.2%	0	5	Sacramento Valley	Elk Grove
8th	35.7%	2	31.2%	2	11.8%	0	8.8%	0	4	Eastern Desert	Victorville
9th	32.9%	2	32.5%	2	15.9%	1	7%	0	5	San Joaquin Valley	Stockton
10th	35.5%	2	29.1%	1	15.3%	1	7.2%	0	4	San Joaquin Valley	Modesto
11th	29%	2	30.7%	3	15.3%	1	14.7%	0	6	Bay Area	Concord
12th	33.8%	3	23.9%	2	11%	0	23.4%	2	7	San Francisco Bay Area	San Francisco
13th	38.7%	3	22.4%	2	8.1%	0	24.7%	2	7	Bay Area	Oakland
14th	31.9%	3	26.4%	2	15.6%	1	14.8%	0	6	Bay Area	Daly City
15th	34.1%	3	29.5%	3	14.4%	0	11.5%	0	6	Bay Area	Hayward
16th	40.9%	3	26.2%	1	12.6%	0	7.2%	0	4	San Joaquin Valley	Fresno, Merced
17th	36.1%	3	25.9%	2	14.3%	0	12.5%	0	5	Bay Area	Fremont, Santa Clara
18th	26.6%	2	29%	2	15.4%	1	17.1%	1	6	Bay Area	Sunnyvale
19th	38.9%	4	25.9%	2	13.6%	0	10.7%	0	6	Bay Area	San Jose
20th	39.8%	3	25.5%	2	10.9%	0	13%	0	5	Central Coast	Salinas
21st	43.2%	3	25.3%	1	13.7%	0	5.1%	0	4	San Joaquin Valley	Kings, Kern, SW Fresno
22nd	34.4%	2	29.1%	2	13%	0	8.8%	0	4	San Joaquin Valley	Visalia
23rd	34.9%	2	30.2%	2	12.2%	0	9%	0	4	South Central California	Bakersfield
24th	35.3%	3	26.8%	2	10.5%	0	14.7%	0	5	Central Coast	Santa Maria
25th	35.6%	3	33.6%	2	10%	0	10%	0	5	LA County	Santa Clarita
26th	34.4%	3	31.1%	2	12.1%	0	11.5%	0	5	Central Coast	Oxnard
27th	35.9%	2	29.2%	2	10.2%	0	15.7%	1	5	LA County	San Gabriel Valley
28th	40%	3	22.7%	2	7.5%	0	21.7%	1	6	LA County	Glendale
29th	49.8%	3	21.5%	2	7.7%	0	11.2%	0	5	LA County	San Fernando Valley
30th	32.6%	3	31.2%	2	11.2%	0	15.4%	1	6	LA County	San Fernando Valley
31st	39.1%	3	32.3%	2	11%	0	8.3%	0	5	Southern California	San Bernardino
32nd	44.7%	3	28.2%	2	10.5%	0	7.5%	0	5	LA County	El Monte
33rd	26.2%	2	34.2%	3	14.3%	0	16.1%	1	6	LA County	Santa Monica, Coastal LA
34th	53.7%	4	16.8%	1	8.1%	0	14.7%	0	5	LA County	Downtown Los Angeles
35th	46.6%	2	28.2%	2	10.9%	0	6.2%	0	4	Southern California	Fontana
36th	27.5%	1	29.8%	2	15.4%	1	8.1%	0	4	Eastern Desert	Indio
37th	35.6%	3	31.3%	2	10.1%	0	16.2%	1	6	LA County	West LA
38th	41.7%	3	30.8%	2	10.5%	0	7.6%	0	5	LA County	Norwalk
39th	36.7%	3	30.5%	2	12.6%	0	9.6%	0	5	Southern California	Fullerton
40th	56.4%	4	20.9%	1	8.9%	0	5.4%	0	5	LA County	East Los Angeles
41st	45%	3	27.9%	2	10.7%	0	7.5%	0	5	Southern California	Riverside
42nd	37%	3	31.6%	2	12.4%	0	7.9%	0	5	Southern California	Corona
43rd	36.5%	3	34.3%	2	10%	0	10.3%	0	5	LA County	Inglewood
44th	44%	3	29.6%	2	6.2%	0	9.6%	0	5	Los Angeles County	Compton
45th	34%	3	29.1%	2	13.5%	0	12%	0	5	Southern California	Irvine
46th	53.7%	2	20%	2	10.5%	0	7.7%	0	4	Southern California	Anaheim
47th	38.5%	3	27.3%	2	10.6%	0	12.2%	0	5	Southern California	Long Beach
48th	30.4%	2	30.3%	2	16.3%	1	11%	0	5	Southern California	Huntington Beach
49th	30.6%	3	30.5%	2	14.6%	0	12.2%	0	5	Southern California	Oceanside
50th	34.9%	2	27.6%	2	13%	0	11.3%	0	4	Southern California	Escondido
51st	49.2%	3	23.7%	2	11.3%	0	6.8%	0	5	Southern California	Downtown San Diego and Border Communities
52nd	30.6%	3	30%	3	13.4%	0	14.6%	0	6	Southern California	North San Diego
53rd	37.8%	3	27.3%	3	10.1%	0	14.5%	0	6	Southern California	Eastern San Diego and suburbs
Total	36.0%	144	27.9%	109	12.1%	7	13.2%	11	271		

Pledged delegates
Delegate type	Bernie Sanders	Joe Biden	Michael Bloomberg	Elizabeth Warren
At-large	51	39	0	0
PLEO	30	24	0	0
District-level	144	109	7	11
Total	225	172	7	11

== See also ==
- 2020 California Republican presidential primary
