= Jonathan Rice =

US public television station and network executive

- Born: 1916
- Died: July 22, 2001 (aged 84–85)
- Education: Stanford University
- Occupation: Journalist
- Spouse: Kathleen Feiblman (1946–1964)

Jonathan Rice (1916 – July 22, 2001) was an American public television station and network executive, who, with James Day, co-founded the San Francisco public television station KQED.

Rice was born in St. Louis, graduated from Stanford University in 1938 with a degree in journalism, and started his career in San Francisco as a photographer and reporter. He covered World War Two from Honolulu as a Marine correspondent. After the war, he was picture book editor for Look Magazine in New York in 1947-48, and news and special events editor for KTLA-TV in Los Angeles. In 1953 he returned to San Francisco, where he was recruited by James Day to create KQED.

Rice remained the program director of KQED until 1978 and served as a board member until 1996. KQED's legacy society is created in his name.

Rice was recognized as an innovator in the public television industry. He is credited with inventing the on-air fundraising auction format and the informal, in-depth approach to news coverage utilized by KQED's Newsroom. During his career he was recognized with the Corporation for Public Broadcasting's Ralph Lowell Medal and the National Academy of Television Arts and Sciences's Governor's Award.
