= KQED (TV) =

Television station in San Francisco

KQED and KQET

KQED: San Francisco (Note: Originally licensed to Berkeley, California; moved to San Francisco in 1956.)–Oakland–San Jose, California; KQET: Watsonville–Santa Cruz–Salinas–Monterey, California; United States
- Channels for KQED: Digital: 30 (UHF), shared with KQEH; Virtual: 9
- Channels for KQET: Digital: 25 (UHF); Virtual: 25
- Branding: KQED

Programming
- Affiliations: 9.1/25.1: PBS; for others, see § Subchannels

Ownership
- Owner: KQED Inc.
- Sister stations: TV: KQEH, KQET; Radio: KQED-FM, KQEI-FM

History
- First air date: KQED: April 5, 1954; KQET: May 17, 1989
- Former call signs: KQET: KCAH (1989–2007)
- Former channel number: KQED: Analog: 9 (VHF, 1954–2009); KQET: Analog: 25 (UHF, 1989–2009); Digital: 58 (UHF, until 2009)
- Former affiliations: KQED: NET (1954–1970)
- Call sign meaning: KQED: Quod erat demonstrandum; KQET: disambiguation of KQED

Technical information
- Licensing authority: FCC
- Facility ID: KQED: 35500; KQET: 8214
- ERP: KQED: 1,000 kW; KQET: 81.1 kW
- HAAT: KQED: 511.7 m (1,679 ft); KQET: 508.6 m (1,669 ft)
- Transmitter coordinates: KQED: 37°45′19″N 122°27′10″W; KQET: 36°45′22.8″N 121°30′8.7″W

Links
- Public license information: KQED: Public file; LMS; KQET: Public file; LMS
- Website: www.kqed.org/tv/

KQED (channel 9) is a PBS member television station licensed to San Francisco, California, United States, serving the San Francisco Bay Area. It is owned by KQED Inc., alongside fellow PBS station KQEH (channel 54) and NPR member KQED-FM (88.5). The three stations share studios on Mariposa Street in San Francisco's Mission District and transmitter facilities at Sutro Tower.

KQET (channel 25) in Watsonville operates as a full-time satellite of KQED, serving the Santa Cruz–Salinas–Monterey market. This station's transmitter is located at Fremont Peak, near San Juan Bautista.

== History ==
KQED was organized and founded by veteran broadcast journalists James Day and Jonathan Rice on June 1, 1953, and first signed on the air on April 5, 1954, as the fourth television station in the San Francisco Bay Area and the sixth public television station in the United States, debuting shortly after the launch of WQED in Pittsburgh. The station's call letters, Q.E.D., are taken from the Latin phrase, quod erat demonstrandum, commonly used in mathematics. The station was originally licensed to Berkeley, but changed its city of license to San Francisco on July 24, 1956.

In its early days following the station's sign-on, KQED broadcast only twice a week for one hour each day. Despite the very limited schedule, the station was still losing money, leading to a decision in early 1955 from its board of trustees to close down the station. Its staff got the board to keep the station on the air and tried to get needed funds from the public in a form of a televised auction, in which celebrities would appear to auction off goods and services donated to the station. While the station still came a little short, it did show that the general public cared to keep KQED on the air. Since then, the auction became a fund-raising tool for many public television stations, though its usage waned in recent years in favor of increased usage of special pledge drives throughout the year.

In 1970, KQED inherited KNEW-TV (channel 32) from Metromedia and changed the station's call letters to KQEC, but found they could not operate it without losing money. Various PBS and locally produced programs from KQED would air erratically and at different times of the day on KQEC. In 1988, the Federal Communications Commission (FCC) revoked KQED's license to operate KQEC, citing excessive off-air time, further charging dishonesty in previous filings with regard to the specific reasons. The alleged dishonesty was in reference to KQED's claim of financial woes for keeping KQEC off the air for most of 1972 through 1977, and again for several months in 1979 and 1980. After being revoked from KQED's hands, the reassigned license was granted to the Minority Television Project (MTP), one of the challengers of the KQED/KQEC filing. The KQEC call letters were changed to KMTP-TV under the new license.

During the early 1990s, when the state of California reintroduced the death penalty, the KQED organization waged a legal battle for the right to televise the forthcoming execution of Robert Alton Harris at San Quentin State Prison. The decision to pursue the videotaping of executions was controversial among those on both sides of the capital punishment debate.

KQED was co-producer of the television adaptation of Armistead Maupin's novel Tales of the City, which aired on PBS stations nationwide in January 1994. The original six-part series was produced by Britain's public-service Channel Four Television Corporation with KQED and PBS' American Playhouse. The series featured gay themes, nudity, and illicit drug use in this fictional portrayal of life in 1970s San Francisco. Although the program gave PBS its highest ratings ever for a dramatic program, PBS bowed to threats of federal funding cuts and announced it would not participate in the television production of an adaptation of the second book in the series, More Tales of the City. The film division of KQED was founded by Irving Saraf.

With financial constraints looming, KQED announced in June 1995 that it would begin showing 30-second advertisements from corporate sponsors the following month.

The station started a school-age channel using some PBS Kids shows and syndicated shows such as The Zula Patrol and Wunderkind Little Amadeus in 2005. KQED also became a PBS Kids Sprout partner, which gave the station goodwill to get carriage on Comcast's systems.

On May 1, 2006, KQED and the KTEH Foundation agreed to merge to form Northern California Public Broadcasting. While broadcasting its own kids channel, the station intended to pick up the planned PBS Kids Go! channel when launched in April 2006. However, the PBS Kids Go! channel was canceled in July 2006 before broadcasting. Since the two stations shared a market and public TV's digital carriage agreement with top cable operators required differentiation of the stations' services, PBS Kids Go! was a way to do so.

On November 11, 2010, KQED and NBR Worldwide, LLC, the owners of PBS business news program, the Nightly Business Report, reached into an agreement to open a bureau in the Silicon Valley to enhance coverage of NBR.

On January 1, 2011, KQED became a default PBS member station for San Luis Obispo, Santa Maria, and Santa Barbara (becoming available on cable providers in those markets), following Los Angeles public television station KCET's defection from PBS, until KCET rejoined PBS in October 2019.

=== KQET ===
This is the KCAH callsign used from 2006 through 2007.

This is the KQET callsign used from 2007 through 2011.

KQED's Watsonville satellite station KQET first signed on the air on May 17, 1989, as KCAH, originally operating as a locally owned PBS member station serving the Monterey area. In the late 1990s, San Jose PBS member station KTEH acquired KCAH, converting channel 25 into a satellite of KTEH. The station changed its call letters to KQET on August 12, 2007, a year after the merger of KQED and KTEH. On October 1, 2007, KQET converted from a satellite of KTEH to a satellite of KQED.

== Programming ==
Typical weekday programming on KQED is dominated by children's programming from 6 a.m. to 2 p.m., with news and other programs running during the remainder of the day. The station's prime time schedule features mainly programs provided by PBS. On Saturdays, children's programming airs during the early morning hours, several cooking shows and other home programming airs during the late morning and afternoon hours, with movies or special programming during the evening and night hours. On Sundays, children's programming airs during the early morning hours, with reruns of popular shows during the daytime and prime time. It is one of the most-watched PBS stations in the country.

KQED has carried the news program PBS NewsHour ever since its debut as a national program in 1975. The program would eventually open a West Coast bureau at KQED's studios in 1997 to extend coverage throughout the United States. Unlike most PBS member stations in the west, KQED airs the Eastern Edition of the NewsHour live at 3 p.m. PT/6 p.m. ET, followed by the Western Edition at 6 p.m. PT.

Noteworthy KQED television productions include the first installment of Armistead Maupin's miniseries Tales of the City, Tongues Untied by Marlon Riggs, Film School Shorts, International Animation Festival hosted by Jean Marsh, and a series of programs focusing on the historic neighborhoods in San Francisco, such as The Castro and the Fillmore District. Most KQED national presentations are distributed by American Public Television. Local productions produced by KQED include Check, Please! Bay Area, Spark, Truly CA, and QUEST. KQED also produced a PBS-distributed program, The Class, a four-part docuseries on six students' journey towards their futures in higher education amid the turmoil of a pandemic year. Other programs produced by KQED and distributed by PBS include nature specials hosted and created by Jean-Michel Cousteau.

=== News operation ===
KQED-TV produced regularly scheduled news programming from 1963 to 2023 on television.

One of KQED's early local programs was World Press, an hour-long weekly roundup of international news stories analyzed by a panel of political analysts, which debuted in 1963. Panel members, who were political science analysts specializing in each specific global area, each brought a newspaper for round table discussion. It was developed by San Francisco Supervisor Roger Boas, who brought his long-term interest in government, politics, television, and business to the show. The program "summed up the foreign reaction to such events as the Kennedy assassinations, the Vietnam War, along with thousands of other events that have shaped the decade of the sixties." What started as a local public access program with no financial support became the longest continuously running discussion program televised on approximately 185 stations.

KQED was best known from the late 1960s through the 1970s for the first nightly news program on public television in the country. During a nine-week-long newspaper strike in 1968, KQED launched Newspaper of the Air, paying striking reporters $100 per week to report on a major story for the show. After the strike ended, the show was relaunched as Newsroom with the help of Fred W. Friendly and a $750,000 grant from the Ford Foundation. For many years, Newsroom was originally anchored by veteran journalist Mel Wax, then by Belva Davis, a pioneering African-American broadcaster. In 1980, the nightly news broadcast was canceled, citing rising costs. It was replaced by a documentary production unit, which thrived for over a decade, producing a series of local documentaries and some major national productions, including two Peabody Award winners, Broken Arrow: Can a Nuclear Weapons Accident Happen Here? (1980–81) and The Case of Dashiell Hammett (1982). The staff also regularly produced feature news stories for the MacNeil/Lehrer Newshour, which was influenced by Newsroom.

Davis continued to host a weekly news program, This Week in Northern California, until her retirement on November 9, 2012. The following year, the program was relaunched as KQED Newsroom, named after the pioneering 1960s show, with Thuy Vu as host on October 18, 2013 (two months after Vu became the host of This Week in Northern California). After Vu left on June 21, 2019, Priya David Clemens became host on February 28, 2020, until the series finale of the program. KQED Newsroom aired its last episode, the second of a two-part retrospective on the station's news operation, on June 23, 2023. KQED Inc. continues to air news and public affairs programming on KQED 88.5 FM, online, and social media platforms.

=== Children's programming ===
Raggs was a children's program produced by KQED for American Public Television and PBS Kids, for syndication to public television stations. Raggs and would first be test-marketed on ten public television stations, including KQED and its partners, before launching nationwide in 2008. On May 11, 2009, PBS announced that the station would co-produce another show, The Cat in the Hat Knows a Lot About That!, for broadcast on PBS Kids.

== Publishing ==
In 1955, KQED began publishing a programming guide called KQED in Focus, which eventually began to add more articles and took on the character of a regular magazine. The title of the publication was later changed to Focus Magazine and then to San Francisco Focus. In 1984, a new programming guide, Fine Tuning was separated from Focus, with Focus carrying on as a self-contained magazine. In the early 1990s, San Francisco Focus was the recipient of number of journalism and publishing awards, including a National Headliner Award for feature writing in 1993. In 1997, KQED sold San Francisco Focus to Diablo Publications to pay off outstanding debt. In 2005, San Francisco Focus was resold to Modern Luxury Media, who rebranded the magazine as San Francisco.

The program guide was published on kqed.org as the Guide. It has been renamed On KQED.

== Technical information ==
=== Subchannels ===
Subchannels of KQED, KQEH, and KQET
Subchannel			Res.	Short name			Programming
KQED	KQEH	KQET	Res.	KQED	KQEH	KQET	Programming
9.1	54.2	25.1	1080i	KQED-HD		KQET-HD	PBS (KQED)
9.2	54.1	25.2	1080i	KQED+HD		KQET+HD	PBS (KQEH)
9.3	54.3	25.3	480i	WORLD			KQED World
9.4	54.4	25.4	480i	KIDS			KQED Kids

=== Analog-to-digital conversion ===
KQED began broadcasting and transmitting a digital television signal on UHF channel 30 on May 15, 2000. KQED shut down its analog signal, over VHF channel 9, on June 12, 2009, as part of the federally mandated transition from analog to digital television. The station's digital signal remained on its pre-transition UHF channel 30, using virtual channel 9.

KQET shut down its analog signal, over UHF channel 25, on May 9, 2009. The station's digital signal relocated from its pre-transition UHF channel 58, which was among the high band UHF channels (52–69) that were removed from broadcasting use as a result of the transition, to its analog-era UHF channel 25.

=== Translator ===
- K31GK-D Ukiah

== See also ==
- San Francisco (magazine)
