= James Day (journalist) =

American public television executive

- Born: December 22, 1918; Alameda, California, US
- Died: April 24, 2008 (aged 89); New York City, New York, US
- Education: Sacramento City College; UC Berkeley
- Occupation: Journalist
- Notable credit(s): Kaleidoscope; Day at Night
- Spouse: Beverley Hare (m. 1943; died 1999)
- Partner: Jeanne Alexander

James Day (December 22, 1918 – April 24, 2008) was an American public television station and network executive and on-air interviewer, and professor of television broadcasting at Brooklyn College. Day was a co-founder, and the founding president and general manager, of pioneer San Francisco public television station KQED, and in 1969 became the final president of National Educational Television (NET) before it closed operations in 1970, making way for its successor, the Public Broadcasting Service (PBS). Day then became general manager of NET's now-former flagship, New York PBS member station WNET. Day was an original PBS board member, and was also a founding board member of the Children's Television Workshop, creators and producers of Sesame Street, which quickly became a flagship children's program for public television.

Day was born in Alameda, California and died in New York City.

One of Day's innovations at KQED was the local news program Newsroom, developed in response to a strike in early 1968 by San Francisco newspaper workers; Newsroom launched the careers of several broadcast journalists, and as the first nightly news program on a public television station, was considered a primary influence and forerunner to what is now PBS NewsHour. (The program still airs, in slightly different form, on KQED to this day under the name KQED Newsroom.) One of his last tasks as general manager of KQED was to bring NPR to the West Coast upon launching KQED-FM in 1969 as one of the new network's first affiliates.

Day was also considered one of the originators of long-form, one-on-one interviews with various celebrities and public figures. He hosted two programs: Kaleidoscope while at KQED, and Day at Night, which he independently produced and syndicated after his 1973 resignation from WNET. Among the numerous figures interviewed by Day were Eleanor Roosevelt, Aldous Huxley, Irving Howe, Eric Hoffer, Ayn Rand and Noam Chomsky.

== Bibliography ==
- Day, James (1995). The Vanishing Vision: The Inside Story of Public Television. Berkeley, CA: University of California Press. ISBN 0-520-08659-7.
