= KQED-FM =

Public radio station in San Francisco and Sacramento

KQED-FM and KQEI-FM

KQED-FM: San Francisco, California; KQEI-FM: North Highlands, California; United States
- Broadcast area: KQED-FM: San Francisco Bay Area; KQEI-FM: Sacramento metropolitan area
- Frequencies: KQED-FM: 88.5 MHz (HD Radio); KQEI-FM: 89.3 MHz (HD Radio)
- Branding: KQED

Programming
- Format: Public radio and talk
- Affiliations: NPR; PRX; APM; BBC World Service

Ownership
- Owner: KQED Inc.

History
- First air date: KQED-FM: April 5, 1963; KQEI-FM: February 21, 1992
- Former call signs: KQED-FM: KXKX (1963–1969)
- Call sign meaning: Quod Erat Demonstrandum "That which is demonstrated" (Latin phrase used in mathematical proofs)

Technical information
- Licensing authority: FCC
- Facility ID: KQED-FM: 35501; KQEI-FM: 20791
- Class: KQED-FM: B; KQEI-FM: A
- ERP: KQED-FM: 110,000 watts; KQEI-FM: 3,300 watts
- HAAT: KQED-FM: 387 meters (1,270 ft); KQEI-FM: 108 meters (354 ft)
- Transmitter coordinates: KQED-FM: 37°41′22.8″N 122°26′16.9″W; KQEI-FM: 38°42′37.6″N 121°28′57.8″W
- Translator(s): See below
- Repeater(s): See below

Links
- Public license information: KQED-FM: Public file; LMS; KQEI-FM: Public file; LMS
- Webcast: website in web browser; via: Mobile App; via: iHeartRadio
- Website: www.kqed.org

KQED-FM (88.5 MHz) is a noncommercial educational radio station licensed to San Francisco, California, United States, that is the primary National Public Radio (NPR) member station for the San Francisco Bay Area. It is simulcast on KQEI-FM (89.3 FM), licensed to North Highlands, California, United States, and serving the Sacramento metropolitan area. Owned by KQED Inc. alongside KQED (channel 9), the station's studios are located on Mariposa Street in San Francisco's Mission District. KQED-FM's transmitter is sited along Radio Road, atop San Bruno Mountain, in Brisbane; KQEI-FM's transmitter is located on Sorento Road in Elverta.

KQED-FM is one of the most-listened-to public radio stations in the United States, and often ranks first in the Nielsen ratings for the San Francisco radio market. KQED's local programming includes Forum with Mina Kim and Alexis Madrigal, The California Report and Tech Nation. In addition to standard analog transmission, KQED-FM is carried on Comcast digital cable channel 960, broadcasts in HD Radio, and is available online, including via iHeartRadio, TuneIn, and Apple Music.

== History ==
Prior KXKX-FM 97.3 MHz (1952–1956) is unrelated.

=== KXKX ===
The San Francisco Theological Seminary, a Presbyterian group, began broadcasting with station KXKX in April 1963. The new 110,000-watt station signed on two years after the seminary received a construction permit from the FCC in August 1961. In addition to Christian radio programming, the station's subcarrier broadcast theology courses to receivers at 44 Bay Area churches.

When agencies of the Presbyterian Church (USA) could no longer support the station, KXKX signed off at midnight on the evening of June 29, 1967.

=== KQED-FM ===
In July 1968, the San Francisco Theological Seminary filed to sell KXKX to the Bay Area Educational Television Association, owner of public television station KQED (channel 9). The station returned to the air as KQED-FM in mid-1969, originally using the studios at 286 Divisadero Street inherited from the seminary. The founding manager was Bernard Mayes, who later went on to be executive vice president of KQED television and also co-founder and chairman of NPR.

The first programming of KQED-FM included news, 'street radio' broadcast live from local street corners, drama and music. In its third year on the air, KQED-FM became one of the first 80 network affiliates of National Public Radio, one of five in California. It aired the first edition of All Things Considered. Later, due to reduced funding, Mayes opened the air to 'Tribal Radio' - productions by local non-profit groups, some in their own languages.

One of the most famous programs to have been broadcast on KQED was An Hour with Pink Floyd, a 60-minute performance by Pink Floyd recorded in 1970 without an audience at the station's studio. The program was broadcast only twice—once in 1970, and once again in 1981. The setlist included "Atom Heart Mother", "Cymbaline", "Grantchester Meadows", "Green Is the Colour", "Careful with That Axe, Eugene", and "Set the Controls for the Heart of the Sun".

=== Expansion into Sacramento ===
In 2003, KQED Radio expanded to the Sacramento metropolitan area by purchasing KEBR-FM on 89.3 MHz. The station is licensed to the suburban community of North Highlands. It signed on the air on February 21, 1992.

KEBR-FM 89.3 was originally owned by Family Radio, a Christian broadcaster based in Oakland at the time. The KEBR-FM call letters and format moved to a more powerful FM station on 88.1 MHz in Sacramento. KQED Radio changed the call sign on 89.3 FM to KQEI-FM. It became a full-time simulcast of KQED-FM in San Francisco.

== Locally-produced shows ==
In 2023, KQED acquired Snap Judgment and Spooked podcasts.

== Programming ==
In addition to local programming, KQED-FM carries content from major public radio distributors such as NPR, the Public Radio Exchange and American Public Media, with the BBC World Service heard late nights.

== Translators ==
In addition to the main station, KQED-FM is relayed by these stations and translators to widen its broadcast area.

Broadcast translators for KQED-FM
Call sign	Frequency	City of license	FID	ERP (W)	HAAT	Class	Transmitter coordinates	FCC info
K201BV	88.1 FM	Benicia-Martinez, California	35499	4 horizontal	112 m (367 ft)	D	38°0′24.7″N 122°8′37.8″W	LMS
K202CT	88.3 FM	Santa Rosa, California	81204	10	308 m (1,010 ft)	D	38°30′30.7″N 122°39′44.9″W	LMS
KQED-FM1	88.5 FM	San Francisco, California	789869	450	449 m (1,473 ft)	D	37°52′56.5″N 122°13′15.1″W	LMS
KQED-FM2	88.5 FM	Alamo, California	789877	140	471 m (1,545 ft)	D	37°48′56.7″N 122°3′44.8″W	LMS
KQED-FM3	88.5 FM	Pleasanton, California	789882	70	409 m (1,342 ft)	D	37°44′20″N 121°59′42.5″W	LMS
KQED-FM4	88.5 FM	Concord, California	789889	75	299 m (981 ft)	D	37°55′56.5″N 122°7′24.1″W	LMS
KQED-FM5	88.5 FM	San Francisco, California	791427	300	125 m (410 ft)	D	38°1′16.5″N 121°59′16.1″W	LMS

KQED and KQEI also broadcast using HD Radio technology.
