= Hans-Joachim Schäfers =

German surgeon, as well as cardiac, thoracic, and vascular surgeon

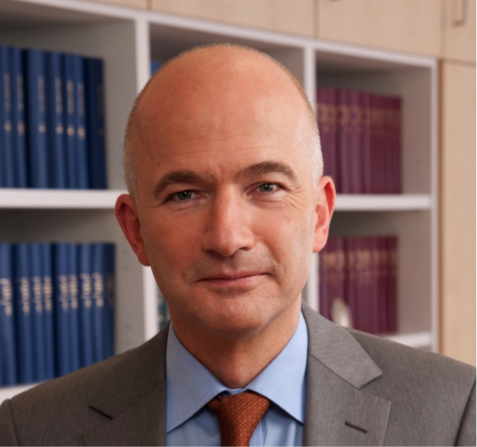
- Born: 1957 (age 68–69)
- Known for: aortic valve repair, aortic surgery, and pulmonary endarterectomy
- Scientific career
- Fields: cardiac, thoracic, and vascular surgeon
- Workplaces: Saarland University

Hans-Joachim Schäfers (born 1957) is a German surgeon, as well as cardiac, thoracic, and vascular surgeon and university professor. He is director of the department of Thoracic and Cardiovascular Surgery at the Saarland University Medical Center in Homburg/Saar, Germany. He is known for his activities in aortic valve repair, aortic surgery, and pulmonary endarterectomy.

== Biography ==
In 1995, he assumed as interim director the leadership of the Department of Thoracic and Cardiovascular at the Saarland University Medical Center in Homburg/Saar. In April 1996, he was formally appointed director of the department and Professor of Surgery. He has assumed different obligations in academic committees, and he has initiated many research projects dealing with cardiac and thoracic surgical challenges. Apart from his wide surgical spectrum in cardiac and thoracic surgery his areas of core competence include operations for aortic aneurysms (especially thoracic aortic aneurysms), surgery for pulmonary hypertension, heart valve reconstruction, and in particular aortic valve reconstruction.

== Scientific contribution ==
The initial research activities of Hans-Joachim Schäfers focused on different clinical problems of heart and lung transplantation. During his fellowship at the University of Toronto (grant of the German Research Council) he investigated the problem of bronchial complications after lung transplantation. Both in Hannover and Homburg he initiated important research projects to minimize bronchial complications and to minimize ischemia-reperfusion injury after lung transplantation. Later projects deal with special aspects of functional mitral regurgitation and aortic surgery. Further research attempted to clarify the mechanisms of intestinal perfusion problems after cardiac surgery and the etiology of aortic aneurysms in the presence of congenital aortic valve malformations, in particular bicuspid aortic valves and unicuspid aortic valves. He developed approaches to improve the concept of pulmonary endarterectomy for thromboembolic pulmonary hypertension. In the past 20 years he has focused on the development and improvement of techniques for aortic valve repair. The concept has been adopted by other surgeons.

== Publications ==
- Hans-Joachim Schäfers: Current treatment of aortic regurgitation (UNI-MED Science) (English) (2013)
- Hans-Joachim Schäfers (ed.): Klinische Grundlagen der Herz- und Thoraxchirurgie (2011)
- Jürgen Haase, Hans-Joachim Schäfers, Horst Sievert, Ron Waksman (eds.): Cardiovascular Interventions in Clinical Practice (English) (2010)
- Hans-Joachim Schäfers: Current Treatment of Mitral Regurgitation (English) (2010)
