= Healthgrades =

US health specialist tracker

Healthgrades Marketplace, LLC
- Type: Subsidiary
- Industry: Health care
- Founded: 1998; 28 years ago
- Headquarters: Charlotte, NC, United States
- Key people: Jeff Hallock, Chief Executive Officer, RVO Health Steve Olin, President, Health Services
- Parent: RVO Health
- Website: healthgrades.com

Healthgrades Marketplace, LLC is a US company that provides information about physicians, hospitals, and healthcare providers. Healthgrades is part of RVO Health, a partnership between Red Ventures and Optum, part of UnitedHealth Group. Healthgrades has amassed information on over three million U.S. health care providers. The company was founded by Kerry Hicks, David Hicks, Peter Fatianow, John Neal, and Sarah Lochran, and is based in Denver, Colorado. Jeff Hallock is RVO Health's CEO. According to USA Today, Healthgrades is the first comprehensive physician rating and comparison database. The application is part of a trend in health technology in the United States towards consumer-driven healthcare.

== History ==
Kerry Hicks founded Healthgrades in 1998. Prior to founding Healthgrades, Hicks was CEO of its predecessor company, Specialty Care Network. In 2008, Healthgrades acquired Ailjor, an online healthcare directory. Healthcare providers could display their business information on the website for the community to view. In 2009, Healthgrades worked with over 400 hospitals in the United States.

An affiliate of Vestar Capital Partners, a private equity firm, acquired Healthgrades in 2010. Healthgrades merged with CPM Marketing Group, a Madison, Wisconsin based company that provides customer relationship management solutions to hospitals. CPM Marketing became CPM Healthgrades, a division of Healthgrades, and now operates as Healthgrades Hospital Solutions group. The merger created a single online company with more than 200 million visitors annually.

In October 2014, Healthgrades launched the first comprehensive physician rating and comparison database in the United States. The database allows users to search for physicians based on their experience in a particular area or procedure. The database's launch coincided with the release of a company-produced report that showed widely varying complication rates for total knee replacement surgeries across 17 Denver-area hospitals. On August 4, 2021, the Healthgrades.com marketplace was sold to Red Ventures while the technology and data platform division rebranded to Mercury Healthcare.

In 2022, RV Health, a Red Ventures business consisting of Healthgrades, Healthline Media (Healthline, Medical News Today, Greatist, Psych Central, Bezzy), and PlateJoy, became a new company in partnership with UnitedHealth Group's Optum. The new company, RVO Health, combines RV Health's content, chronic condition communities, and tools with Optum Perks, Optum Store, and Rally Coach.

== Ratings ==
Healthgrades evaluates hospitals solely on risk-adjusted mortality and in-hospital complications. Its website evaluates roughly 500 million claims from federal and private reviews and data to rate and rank doctors based on complication rates at the hospitals where they practice, experience, and patient satisfaction. Its analysis is based on approximately 40 million Medicare discharges for the most recent three-year time period available. Hospital rating reports for specific procedures and diagnoses are compiled primarily from Medicare claim data and include all hospitals that are Medicare participants. Some critics argue that claim data is not adequate to make determinations about the quality of care and that conclusions should be drawn from medical records. Peer-reviewed research has shown that measures of mortality and complication rates based on administrative data can be used to measure clinical quality. Ratings are updated yearly, but data is two years old before Medicare releases it.

Healthgrades develops objective ratings based on data and information from several publicly available sources. The data is analyzed using a proprietary methodology that identifies the recipients of the various awards and the "1-3-5 Star" designation. Specifically, most ratings are determined from multivariate logistic regressions of medical outcomes at a given healthcare provider to risk-adjust the patients and 1-, 3- and 5-star awards are given to providers whose negative outcomes are worse than expected, near predicted levels, and better than expected, respectively. The ratings have been criticized for oversights in the methodology that may penalize some institutions with ideal medical outcomes. Nash et al. have expressed "concern about the reliability and validity of such 'black box' rating scales."

In addition to star ratings, Healthgrades recognizes facilities for America's 50, 100, and 250 Best Hospitals, Specialty Excellence Awards, Outstanding Patient Experience, and Patient Safety. The hospital quality awards bestowed by Healthgrades are intended to help patients make an informed choice about where to get treated.

== Products ==
=== Website ===
Time listed the Healthgrades website as one of its 50 best websites of 2011. The information Healthgrades provides includes information on doctors' board certifications, types of procedures offered, and which insurance plans offices accept. However, information such as healthcare provider degrees is often inaccurate on the site, significantly limiting its use and raising concern that other information on the site may also be incorrect. It also lists a doctor's hospital affiliations and information on hospital performance collected from government data. Web visitors can input their opinions in a survey based on their experience with an individual healthcare professional and view provider ratings at no charge. The survey evaluates a doctor's communication skills, the friendliness of the office staff, and whether it's easy to get an urgent appointment. Healthgrades was featured in a study analyzing the trends of otolaryngologists' online ratings published in JAMA in 2014. The study confirmed that although physician's feelings toward the presence of online rating websites tend to be negative, the awareness of and the use of them by patients has increased and may help physicians manage their online reputation.

According to comScore, Healthgrades began receiving approximately 17 million unique visitors monthly in January 2014. Many companies and health plans make Healthgrades information available to their participants.

=== Licensing ===
Hospitals that are highly rated providers will license Healthgrades' ratings and trademarks for marketing promotions. The company uses litigation to protect its name and ratings. Healthgrades sued the Robert Wood Johnson University Hospital in 2006 for copyright and trademark infringement after the hospital used Healthgrades' ratings and logo in promotional publications without paying licensing fees.

== Independent evaluation ==
Medical experts have questioned the reliability of the 1-, 3- and 5-star ratings given to healthcare providers, criticizing the lack of transparency and perceived oversights in Healthgrades' methodology.

A study published in JAMA in 2002 reported that Healthgrades ratings for mortality associated with acute myocardial infarction identified "groups of hospitals differing in the aggregate in quality of care and outcomes" but heterogeneity within the ratings for individual hospitals could not reliably discriminate between individual hospitals in quality of care or mortality. To illustrate: for any pair of hospitals rated to two different rating groups (1-, 3- or 5-star) by Healthgrades, the researchers determined that standardized mortality rates were "comparable or even better in the lower-rated hospital in more than 90% of the comparisons."

The Rocky Mountain News concluded that Healthgrades had inaccurate physician disciplinary records (while competitor ChoicePoint had much greater accuracy) in 2004. The report also detailed the complaints of former Healthgrades employees and physicians that pursued legal actions after inaccurate reports.

Research published in Journal of the American College of Surgeons in 2010 compared mortality in U.S. News & World Report and Healthgrades lists of "Best Hospitals" for abdominal aortic aneurysm repair, coronary artery bypass, aortic valve repair and mitral valve repair. Risk-adjusted mortality was found to be statistically significantly lower in the Healthgrades' "Best Hospitals" for coronary artery bypass and aortic valve repair.

A similar study published in Archives of Surgery in 2011 evaluated Healthgrades and U.S. News & World Report ratings in oncologic surgeries, comparing top-rated hospitals in the two reports to all other U.S. hospitals. The authors determined that both ratings systems had substantive flaws in the evaluation of mortality following pancreatectomy, esophagectomy or colectomy; only the top rated hospitals for colectomy in the U.S. News & World Report ratings had a statistically significant lower mortality than national averages—mortality rates at Healthgrades' best hospitals were not significantly lower for any of the three procedures.

The eHealthcare Awards gave Healthgrades a platinum award for Best Doctor Directory, Consumer General Health in 2019 and 2021, and Best Provider Directory, Consumer General Health in 2023.

== Criticism ==
In 2010, AOL criticized the company for its use of "automatic renewal" subscription charges to customers who purchased physician reports. Healthgrades discontinued all consumer-based credit card product offerings in 2011. In addition, ConsumerAffairs.com shows an unfavorable rating of Healthgrades.com, listing allegations of inaccurate healthcare provider information, modified or falsified reviews left by consumers, and an inability to validate reviews properly before being posted. A 2016 article published in Consumer Reports identified a case where Healthgrades failed to divulge 18 malpractice suits against Leonard Kurian, a physician reviewed on its site, bringing into question the quality of reviews it provides. Healthgrades will disable and remove therapy and psychology accounts if requested.

Healthgrades Help Center FAQs states providers who have received an unsatisfactory patient survey may improve their overall survey score: “The best strategy to improve your overall survey score is to encourage more of your patients to complete Patient Satisfaction Surveys. The more patient surveys you have, the less impact a few bad scores have on your overall survey score. Use our Patient Engagement Resources to help you encourage patients to complete surveys.” This suggestion to providers from Healthgrades violates both National Association of Social Workers Code of Ethics and American Psychological Code of Ethics: The Code of Ethics of the National Association of Social Workers, Section 4.07, states that it is unethical for social workers to solicit testimonials: "(b) Social workers should not engage in solicitation of testimonial endorsements (including solicitation of consent to use a client's prior statement as a testimonial endorsement) from current clients or other persons who, because of their particular circumstances are vulnerable to undue influence." Also, The American Psychological Association's Ethics Code states that it is unethical for psychologists to solicit testimonials: Principle 5.05 "Psychologists do not solicit testimonials from current therapy clients/patients or other persons who because of their particular circumstances are vulnerable."

== Similar sites ==
- WebMD.com
- Vitals.com
- Arztadressen (in German)
