= Open aortic surgery =

Surgical technique

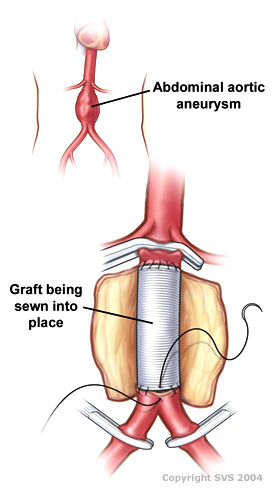
- Drawing of an open infrarenal aortic aneurysm repair using a tube graft
- Other names: Open aortic repair
- Specialty: Vascular surgery

Open aortic surgery (OAS), also known as open aortic repair (OAR), describes a technique whereby an abdominal, thoracic or retroperitoneal surgical incision is used to visualize and control the aorta for purposes of treatment, usually by the replacement of the affected segment with a prosthetic graft. OAS is used to treat aneurysms of the abdominal and thoracic aorta, aortic dissection, acute aortic syndrome, and aortic ruptures.

Aortobifemoral bypass is also used to treat atherosclerotic disease of the abdominal aorta below the level of the renal arteries. In 2003, OAS was surpassed by endovascular aneurysm repair (EVAR) as the most common technique for repairing abdominal aortic aneurysms in the United States.

Depending on the extent of the aorta repaired, an open aortic operation may be called an Infrarenal aortic repair, a Thoracic aortic repair, or a Thoracoabdominal aortic repair. A thoracoabdominal aortic repair is a more extensive operation than either an isolated infrarenal or thoracic aortic repair.

OAS is distinct from aortic valve repair and aortic valve replacement, as OAS describes surgery of the aorta, rather than of the heart valves. When the aortic valve is diseased in addition to the ascending aorta, the Bentall procedure is used to treat the entire aortic root. An axillary-bifemoral bypass is another type of vascular bypass used to treat aortic pathology, however it is not true open aortic surgery as it reconstructs the flow of blood to the legs from the arm, rather than in the native location of the aorta.

== Medical uses ==
Open aortic surgery (OAS) is used to treat patients with aortic aneurysms greater than 5.5 cm in diameter, to treat aortic rupture of an aneurysm any size, to treat aortic dissections, and to treat acute aortic syndrome. It is used to treat infrarenal aneurysms, as well as juxta- and pararenal aneurysm, thoracic and thoracoabdominal aneurysms, and also non-aneurysmal aortic pathology. Disease of the aorta proximal to the left subclavian artery in the chest lies within the specialty of cardiac surgery, and is treated via procedures such as the valve-sparing aortic root replacement.

== Open repair versus endovascular repair ==
Prior to the advent of endovascular aneurysm repair (EVAR), OAS was the only surgical treatment available for aortic aneurysms. The shift away from open aortic surgery towards endovascular surgery since 2003 has been driven by worse perioperative mortality associated with OAS, particularly in patients in relatively frail health. Unlike endovascular repair, there are no strict anatomic contra-indications to open repair; Rather, open repair is viewed as the fall back option for patients with unfavorable anatomy for endovascular repair. The main drawback of open repair is the larger physiologic demand of the operation, which is associated with increased rates of short term mortality in most studies.

OAR is still preferred to EVAR at some institutions and by some patients as it may be more durable than EVAR, and does not require post-operative surveillance CT scans.

Patients younger than 50 years with descending and thoracoabdominal aortic aneurysm have low surgical risks, and open repairs can be performed with excellent short-term and durable long-term results. Open surgical repairs should be considered initially in younger patients requiring descending and thoracoabdominal aortic aneurysm repairs. Heritable thoracic aortic disease (HTAD) warrants closer postoperative surveillance.

OAS is sometimes required for patients who have previously undergone EVAR but need further treatment, such as for degeneration of the EVAR seal zones leading to continued aneurysm growth. OAS is also sometimes required in cases of EVAR graft infection where the stent graft is removed to treat the infection.

== Technique ==
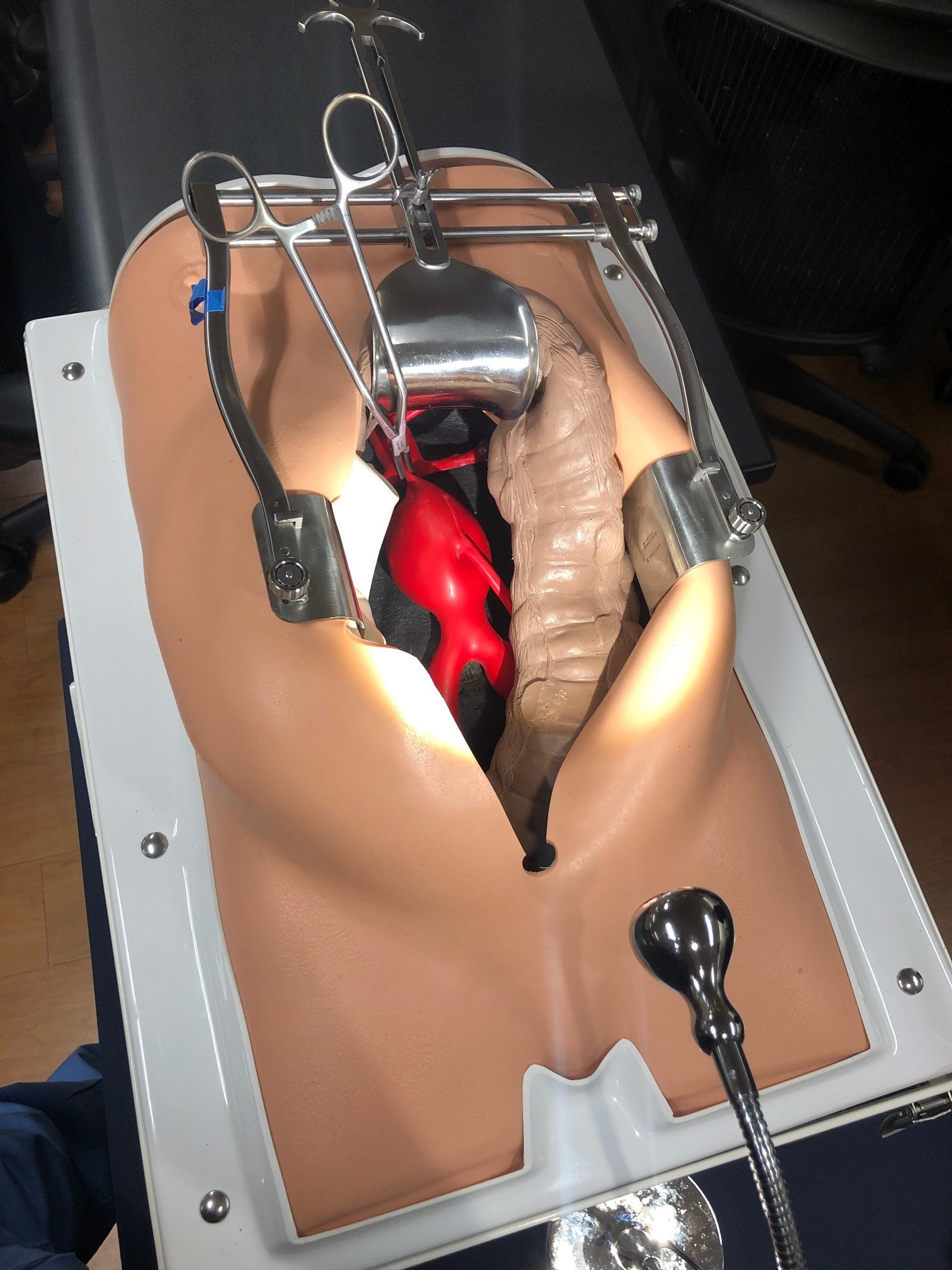
Simulated open aortic surgery for an infrarenal aortic aneurysm. The clamp seen is above the aneurysm and below the renal arteries

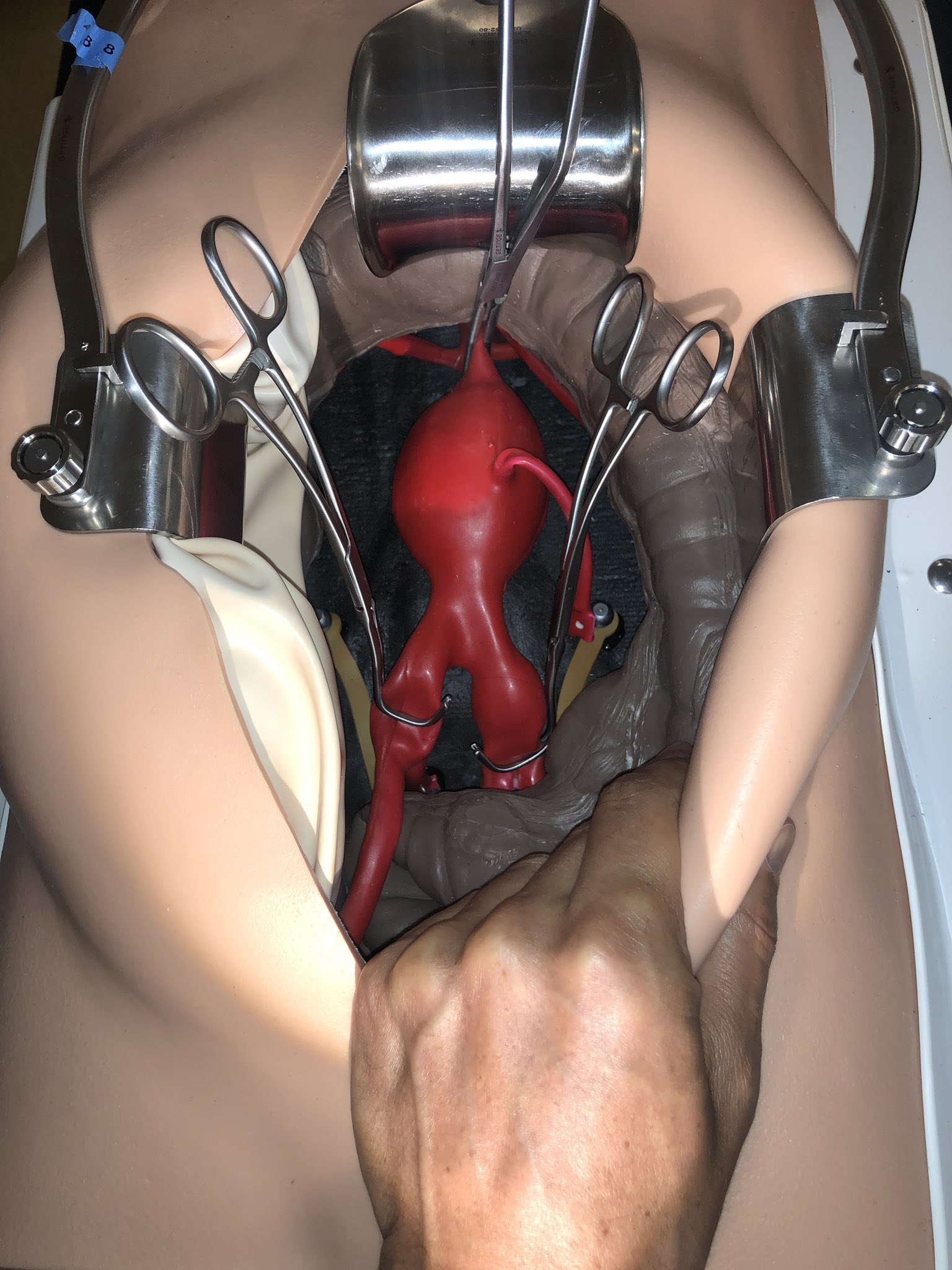
Simulated clamp placement for open repair of an infrarenal aortic aneurysm

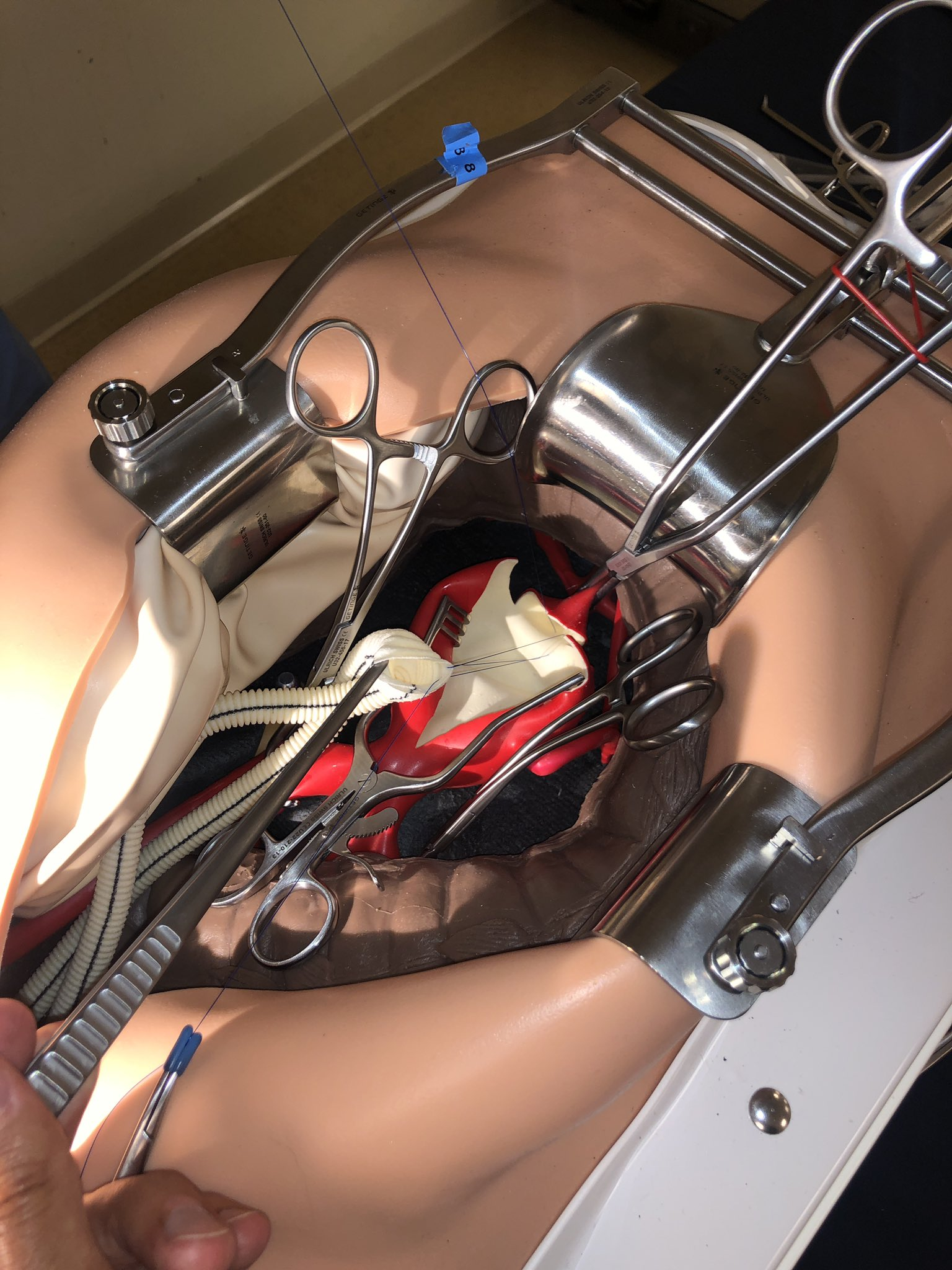
Simulated proximal suture line using "parachute" technique for an open infrarenal aortic aneurysm repair

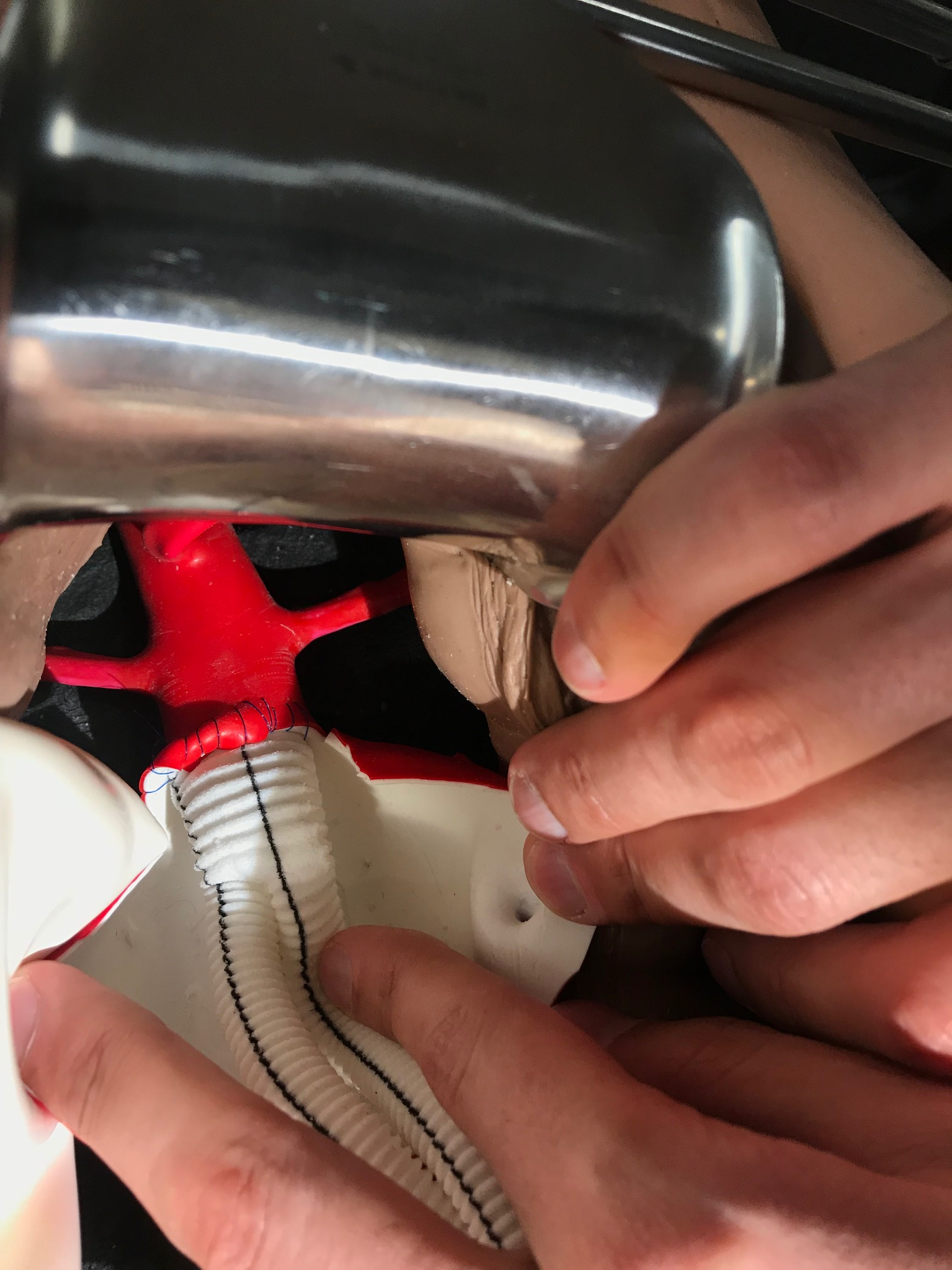
Completed proximal suture line of a simulated infrarenal open aortic repair with a dacron bifurcated graft

Open surgery typically involves exposure of the dilated portion of the aorta and insertion of a synthetic (Dacron or Gore-Tex) graft (tube). Once the graft is sewn into the proximal (toward the patient's head - and more specifically, towards their aortic valve) and distal (toward the patient's foot) portions of the aorta, the aneurysmal sac is closed around the graft.

The aorta and its branching arteries are cross-clamped during open surgery. This can lead to inadequate blood supply to the spinal cord, resulting in paraplegia, when repairing thoracic aneurysms. A 2004 systematic review and meta analysis found that cerebrospinal fluid drainage (CFSD), when performed in experienced centers, reduces the risk of ischemic spinal cord injury by increasing the perfusion pressure to the spinal cord. A 2012 Cochrane systematic review noted that further research regarding the effectiveness of CFSD for preventing a spinal cord injury is required.

=== Approach ===
The infrarenal aorta can be approached via a transabdominal midline or paramedian incision, or via a retroperitoneal approach.

The paravisceral and thoracic aorta are approached via a left-sided posteriolateral thoracotomy incision in approximately the 9th intercostal space. For a thoracoabdominal aortic aneurysm, this approach can be extended to a median or paramedian abdominal incision to allow access to the iliac arteries.

=== Sequential aortic clamping ===
At medical centers with a high volume of open aortic surgery, the fastest option for open aortic surgery was sequential aortic clamping or "clamp-and-sew", whereby the aorta was clamped proximally and distally to the diseased segment, and a graft sewn into the intervening segment. This technique leaves the branches of the aorta un-perfused during the time it takes to sew in the graft, potentially increasing the risk of ischemia to the organs which derive their arterial supply from the clamped segment. Critics of this technique advocate intra-operative aortic perfusion. In infrarenal aneurysms, the relative tolerance of the lower extremities to ischemia allows surgeons to clamp distally with low risk of ill effect.

=== Techniques to limit ischemia ===
A number of techniques exist for maintaining perfusion to the viscera and spinal cord during open thoracoabdominal aortic aneurysm repair, including left heart bypass, balloon perfusion catheter placement in the visceral arteries, selective spinal drainage and cold crystalloid renal perfusion. There is limited evidence supporting these techniques.

=== Graft configuration ===
In OAS for infra-renal aneurysms, the abdominal aorta is anastomosed preferentially to the main limb of a tube or bifurcated graft in an end-to-end fashion to minimize turbulent flow at the proximal anastomosis. If normal aorta exists superior to the iliac bifurcation, a tube graft can be sewn distally to that normal aorta. If the distal aorta is diseased, a bifurcated graft can be used in an aorto-billiac or aorto-bifemoral configuration. If visceral vessels are involved in the diseased aortic segment, a branched graft can be used with branches sewn directly to visceral vessels, or the visceral vessels can be separately revascularized.

=== Reimplantation of the inferior mesenteric artery ===
Because of collateral blood flow from the superior mesenteric artery (SMA) via the marginal artery, the inferior mesenteric artery usually does not have to be reimplanted into the aortic graft when performing an open abdominal aortic aneurysm repair.

== Risks and complications ==
OAS is widely recognized as having higher rates of perioperative morbidity and mortality than endovascular procedures for comparable segments of the aorta. For example, in infrarenal aneurysms, perioperative mortality with endovascular surgery is approximately 0.5%, against 3% with open repair.

Besides the risk of death, other risks and complications with OAS depend on the segment of aorta involved, and may include renal failure, spinal cord ischemia leading to paralysis, buttock claudication, ischemic colitis, embolization leading to acute limb ischemia, infection, and bleeding. Development of spinal cord injury is associated with increased perioperative mortality after the complex aortic repair.

Aortic graft infections occur in 1-5% of aortic prosthetic placements. It can result in limb amputation, pseudo-aneurysm formation, septic emboli, aorto-enteric fistulae, septic shock and death. The most frequently involved pathogens are Staphylococcus aureus, and coagulase-negative staphylococci, followed by Enterobacterales and uncommon bacteria. In case of gut involvement, fungi may also play a role. For patients unable to undergo major surgery, the outcome of conservative approach remains uncertain but usually provides for life-long suppressive antibiotic therapy. In selected cases an attempt of stopping antibiotic treatment after 3-6 months can be done.

== Recovery after OAS ==
Recovery time after OAS is substantial. Immediately following surgery, patients can expect to spend 1–3 days in the intensive care unit, followed by 4–10 days on the hospital ward. After discharge, patients will take 3–6 months to fully recover their energy and return to their pre-operative daily activities. However, enhanced recovery after surgery (ERAS) protocols can improve recovery following surgery.

Open repair for thoracoabdominal aneurysms requires a very large incision that cuts through muscles and sometimes bones making recovery very difficult and painful for the patient. Intraoperative intercostal nerve cryoanalgesia has been used during procedure to help reduce pain after TAAA.

== History ==
The history of aortic surgery dates back to Greek surgeon Antyllus, who first performed surgeries for various aneurysms in the second century CE. Many advancements of OAS have been developed in the past century.

In 1955, cardiovascular surgeons, Drs. Michael DeBakey and Denton Cooley performed the first replacement of a thoracic aneurysm with a homograft. In 1958, they began using the Dacron graft, resulting in a revolution for surgeons in the surgical repair of aortic aneurysms. DeBakey was first to perform cardiopulmonary bypass to repair the ascending aorta, using antegrade perfusion of the brachiocephalic artery.

By the mid-1960s, at Baylor College of Medicine, DeBakey's group began performing surgery on thoracoabdominal aortic aneurysms (TAAA), which presented formidable surgical challenges, often fraught with serious complications, such as paraplegia, paraparesis and renal failure. DeBakey protégé and vascular Surgeon, E. Stanley Crawford, in particular, began dedicating most of his time to TAAAs. In 1986, he classified TAAA open surgery cases into four types: Extent I, extending from the left subclavian artery to just below the renal artery; Extent II, from the left subclavian to below the renal artery; Extent III, from the sixth intercostal space to below the renal artery; and Extent IV, from the twelfth intercostal space to the iliac bifurcation (i.e. total abdominal).

In 1992, another classification, Extent V, characterized by Hazim J. Safi, MD, identified aneurysmal disease extending from the sixth intercostal space to above the renal arteries. Safi's group used experimental animal models for a prospective study on the use distal aortic perfusion, cerebrospinal fluid drainage, moderate hypothermia and sequential clamping to decrease in the incidence of neurological deficit. In 1994, they presented their experiences, showing that the incidence for Extent I and II dropped from 25% to 5%. This marked a new era for protecting the spinal cord, brain, kidneys, heart and lungs during OAS on TAAA.

== Progress and future challenges ==
Postoperative paraplegia and paraparesis have been the scourge of thoracoabdominal aortic repair since the inception of the procedure. However, with evolving surgical strategies, identification of predictors, and use of various adjuncts over the years, the incidence of spinal cord injury after thoracic/thoracoabdominal aortic repair has declined. Embracing a multimodality approach offers a good insight into combating this grave complication

== See also ==
- Aortic valve repair
