= Bentall procedure =

Type of heart surgery

- Specialty: Cardiothoracic surgery, cardiac surgery

The Bentall procedure is a type of cardiac surgery involving composite graft replacement of the aortic valve, aortic root, and ascending aorta, with re-implantation of the coronary arteries into the graft. This operation is used to treat combined disease of the aortic valve and ascending aorta, including lesions associated with Marfan syndrome. The Bentall procedure was first described in 1968 by Hugh Bentall and Antony De Bono. It is considered a standard for individuals who require aortic root replacement, and the vast majority of individuals who undergo the surgery receive mechanical valves.

== History ==
Since its inception, the Bentall procedure has been considered a gold standard of aortic valve replacement.

=== Types of conduits ===
- Mechanical valves - The majority of cases utilize mechanical valves because of its long term durability, improved probability of long term survival, and decreased need for reoperation. Notably, these do require life-long anticoagulation to minimize the risk of blood clots, which has an increased risk of bleeding.
- Biological/ bioprosthetic - Not as often used due to the increased likelihood of needing a repeat graft replacement from decreased longitudinal durability. However, usually does not require lifelong anticoagulation, making it a considerable option for patients with an increased fall or bleeding risk.

Importantly, the use of mechanical vs biologic valves are not predictive of quality of life overall, morbidity and mortality. General guidelines for the repair of valvular heart disease indicate the medical team takes into consideration the following patient factors for the determination of best conduit to use: age, life expectancy, lifestyle choices (diet, exercise, hobbies, risk of potential falls/ physical trauma), medical history (history of stroke or blood clots), likelihood of surgical or transcatheter repeat procedure, and of course patient preference.

== Indications and benefits ==
The Bentall procedure is considered for patients who may have Marfan syndrome, aortic dissection, aortic root aneurysm, aortic regurgitation of the valve, calcification of the aortic valve, and congenital anomalies.

== Complications and risks ==
Early Morbidity and Mortality Within 30 days of hospitalization, morbidity and mortality after Bentall procedure are associated with complications stemming from cardiac arrhythmia, pneumonia, acute respiratory distress syndrome (ARDS), sepsis, graft infection, wound infection, neurologic/ cerebrovascular accident and stroke, hemorrhage/ bleeding, myocardial infarction, pericardial effusion, organ damage/ deterioration. Overall, these complications are seen in < 6% of patients undergoing this procedure, with risk of complications being greatly associated with other preexisting risk factors and comorbidities.

=== Graft infection and assessment ===
Like early morbidity and mortality, infection of a graft after Bentall Procedure is rare affecting < 5% of cases, but can be of very serious consequence to the patient. Many of these patients who develop infections have multiple comorbidities and risk factors existing before the surgery including diabetes, suppression of the immune system, preexisting cardiovascular issues outside of the direct indication for a Bentall procedure and cancer.

Graft infection from a Bentall procedure presents similarly to many infections after a major cardiac surgery, with indications in various degrees of severity. Symptoms can include fever, chills, loss of appetite, weight loss, malaise with clinical indications including septic emboli, abscess, left ventricular fistulae, transient ischemic attack. These can occur weeks to years after the Bentall procedure itself.

If a patient is suspected to have a graft infection, they should immediately seek medical attention. Evaluation of an infection may include blood work including CBC, CMP, blood cultures. Further assessment and imaging may involve transesophageal echocardiography, CT scan, CT Angiography, PET scan. Depending on the modality, evidence of infection includes: increased glucose uptake, pseudoaneurysm, fistula, fluid/ attenuation around the graft (indicating increased inflammation), or other increased signs of inflammation around the graft; these findings are then taken into account and assessed in the context of the clinical/ symptomatic picture of the patient.

If a graft infection is highly likely, treatment involves admission to a hospital setting and administration of IV antibiotics. If the infection does not resolve, a graft infection may eventually require either an attempt at graft salvage or a revision surgery for the removal of the infected graft.

== Alternatives ==
Valve sparing aortic root replacement (VSARR) is an alternative procedure to the composite aortic valve graft (CAGVR, Bentall procedure). A notable benefit of VSARR is the reduced need for anticoagulation, as the patient's own aortic valve is spared and does not need to be replaced with a mechanical or bioprosthetic valve.

The VSARR is relatively new compared to the Bentall procedure and is performed about two thirds less often, associated with the increased skill and learning curve needed to navigate the procedure. Additionally, literature overall has shown unclear longevity and longitudinal patient outcomes compared to the Bentall procedure. Recently, there is some evidence VSARR has superior survival rates at 10 and 15 years along with reduced early mortality. Moreover, while there is a decreased reoperation rate in the first 5 years seen with the Bentall procedure, the need for reoperation after Bentall and VSARR are then comparable thereafter.

Vocabulary:

- Yacoub procedure - Aorta is remodeled. Consider for older people and aneurysms not caused by a genetic disorder.
- David procedure - Uses complex techniques. Reimplant aortic valve. Useful for younger patients. Also useful for people with a genetic cause of heart syndromes like bicuspid aortic valve.

== Future directions ==
Based on the case reports identified in the current literature, two concepts of Endobentall have emerged; the first involves using a balloon-expandable valve in combination with a tubular graft across the left ventricular outflow tract (LVOT), either as a one-stage or two-stage device. The second concept is a physician-constructed self-expandable valve conduit.

Candidacy of this procedure is determined by an interdisciplinary team which may include cardiac and vascular surgeons, as well as interventional cardiologists.

The ascending aorta presents numerous challenges for endovascular intervention due to its proximity to critical structures including the sinotubular junction, aortic valve, coronary ostia, and arch vessels as well as its short length, variable wall elasticity, high-pressure flow, elevated shear stress, turbulence, and complex dynamic motion with rotational forces.

== See also ==
- Aortic valve replacement
- Marfan syndrome
- Ross procedure
- Valve-sparing aortic root replacement
- Open aortic surgery
- Endovascular aneurysm repair
