= Larry Cohn =

Larry Cohn may refer to:

- Lawrence Cohn (born 1932), American lawyer, blues collector and record company executive
- Lawrence H. Cohn (1937–2016), American cardiac surgeon and educator
