= Hazim J. Safi =

Physician

Hazim Jawad Safi MD, FACS
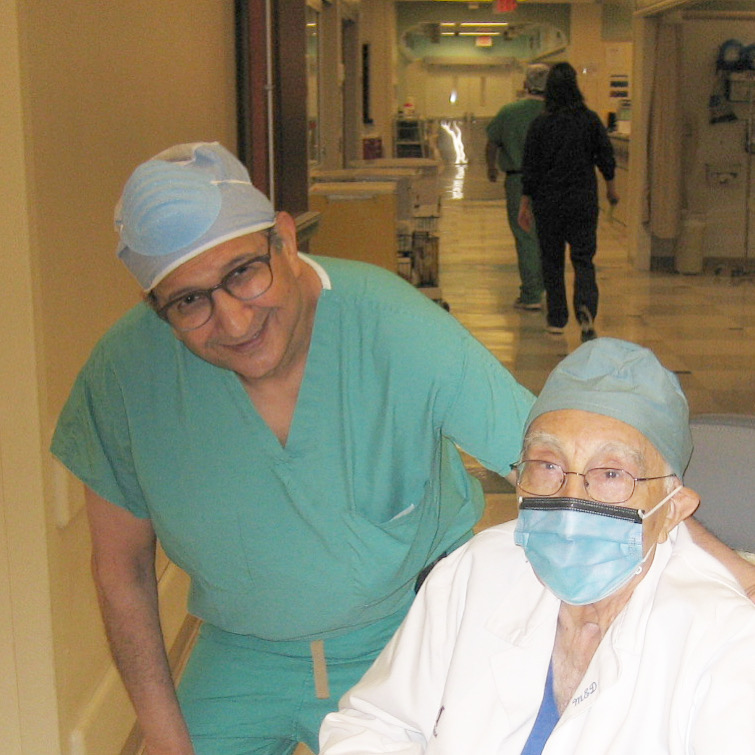
- Hazim J. Safi (left)
- Born: 1946 (age 79–80); Baghdad, Iraq
- Education: Baghdad University College of Medicine
- Years active: 1970–present
- Medical career
- Profession: Physician
- Field: Cardiothoracic surgery
- Institutions: Baylor College of Medicine, Memorial Hermann–Texas Medical Center, The University of Texas Health Science Center at Houston
- Sub-specialties: Surgical correction of aortic aneurysms
- Research: Aortic dissection
- Website: med.uth.edu/cvs/faculty/hazim-j-safi-md-facs

Hazim J. Safi (born 1946) is a physician and surgeon who is well known for his research in the surgical treatment of aortic disease. Safi and his colleagues at Baylor College of Medicine were the first to identify variables associated with early death and postoperative complications in patients undergoing thoracoabdominal aortic operations. Safi now serves as professor of cardiothoracic surgery, and founding chair at McGovern Medical School at The University of Texas Health Science Center in Houston, TX.

== Education ==
Born in Baghdad, Safi was raised within the city limits by his mother. He graduated valedictorian from his high school, before completing a master's degree at Baghdad University College of Medicine in 1970. In 1975, he completed a surgical residency at the Medical City Teaching Hospital in Baghdad, followed by a surgical fellowship at St. James Hospital in London, England in 1977. While attending a conference in England, Safi was introduced to Michael DeBakey, who extended Safi an invitation to work alongside him at Baylor College of Medicine in Houston, TX. In 1981 and 1983, Safi completed two surgical fellowships at Baylor.

== Early career ==
Prior to joining the surgical faculty team at Baylor, Safi developed an interest in the aorta, specifically the causes and treatments of thoracoabdominal aortic aneurysms (TAAAs). While completing his fellowship at Baylor, Safi worked in the early 1980s as a protégé under Dr. Stanley Crawford https://pubmed.ncbi.nlm.nih.gov/6231006/ with the goal of advancing surgical care and post-operative recovery for patients with TAAA. From 1983 to 1998, while working at Baylor, Safi authored and co-authored several research papers with Crawford in peer-reviewed journals citing best practices and identifying determinants for outcomes in patients receiving surgical repair of the aorta. The American College of Cardiology, the New England Journal of Medicine, and the European Heart Journal have since cited his work as the clinical standard for care when treating patients for TAAAs.

== Thoracic Aortic Disease ==
In the late 80s and throughout the 90s, Safi worked to identify significant influences in pre-operative evaluations and treatments, as well as modifications in operations and post-operations, to improve patient outcomes after surgical repair of the aorta. He and his team identified myocardial infarction, respiratory failure, renal failure, and stroke as the primary causes of death and morbidity after thoracic aorta surgery, indicating that the assessment of the function of those organs is essential to increasing the probability of survival after surgery. His work showcased that a history of smoking and the presence of chronic pulmonary disease are common predictors of post-surgery respiratory failure among patients who undergo surgery for the descending thoracic and thoracoabdominal aorta, requiring a lateral thoracotomy. In the 90s, Safi and his colleagues at Baylor developed a surgical technique for TAAA repair using distal aortic perfusion and cerebrospinal fluid drainage.

In 2008, Safi participated in a study that reviewed factors correlated with post-surgery outcomes for the repair of the thoracic aorta by stent graft and offered suggestions for treatment. The paper provided evidence that open repair of the descending thoracic aorta does not require reoperation and remains durable for over 13 years after treatment.

A retrospective analysis by Safi and colleagues concluded that cerebrospinal fluid pressure drainage was advantageous in reducing the risk of spinal cord injury in open aneurysm repairs. In 2003, Safi and his team published an article in the Annals of Surgery, highlighting favorable patient outcomes, especially in reducing immediate neurological deficit, when using distal aortic perfusion and cerebrospinal fluid drainage for thoracoabdominal and descending thoracic aortic aneurysm repair. Their study included data from January 1991 to February 2003, during which time the team performed 1004 thoracoabdominal or descending thoracic aortic repairs. That following year, Safi's methods were reinforced by other surgeons treating aortic disease and became recognized as a standardized surgical technique for surgeons performing open thoracic aortic aneurysm repair.

== Later career ==
In 1999, Safi left his faculty appointment at Baylor to help build and develop the Heart and Vascular Institute at Memorial Hermann–Texas Medical Center. Safi was a professor and the first chair of the department of cardiothoracic and vascular surgery at the University of Texas Health Science Center at Houston (UTHealth). In 2019, Safi stepped down as chair and appointed cardiothoracic surgeon Anthony Estrera, MD as his successor. Safi holds his faculty position as a professor at UTHealth and is still active in research and trials to advance the treatment of aortic disease.

On March 4, 2020, Safi was presented with a festschrift during a lecture of contributing writers. Attended by nearly 200 guests, the event paid tribute to his contributions to academic medicine and the field of cardiothoracic and vascular surgery.

== Scholarly work and contributions to science ==
Safi has authored and co-authored over 30 book chapters and has published nearly 300 articles in medical journals. According to a meta-research paper by Stanford Medicine researcher and scientist John Ioannidis, Safi was one of the world's top 2% contributors to the field of science in 2020. This analysis was reviewed and annotated by the Meta-Research Innovation Center at Stanford. Counting self-citations, the paper indicated that Safi's work had been cited 16,244 times in 9,941 distinct papers, and calculated that his h-index was 71 as of 2020. One of Safi's articles, published in 1993 in the Journal of Vascular Surgery, has been cited over 1,000 times as of 2020 and provides evidence supporting best practices for improving 30-day survival and outcomes for patients receiving surgery to repair the aorta.

== Selected works ==
- Svensson, Lars G.; Crawford, E. Stanley; Hess, Kenneth R.; Coselli, Joseph S.; Safi, Hazim J. (1 February 1993). "Experience with 1509 Patients Undergoing Thoracoabdominal Aortic Operations". Journal of Vascular Surgery. 17 (2). Elsevier: 357–370. doi:10.1016/0741-5214(93)90421-H. ISSN 0741-5214. PMID 8433431.
- Crawford, E. Stanley; Crawford, John L.; Safi, Hazim J.; Coselli, Joseph S.; Hess, Kenneth R.; Brooks, Barbara; et al. (1 March 1986). "Thoracoabdominal Aortic Aneurysms: Preoperative and Intraoperative Factors Determining Immediate and Long-term Results of Operations in 605 Patients" (PDF). Journal of Vascular Surgery. 3 (3). Elsevier: 389–404. doi:10.1016/0741-5214(86)90101-1. ISSN 0741-5214. PMID 3951025.
- Svensson, Lars G.; Kouchoukos, Nicholas T.; Miller, D. Craig; Bavaria, Joseph E.; Coselli, Joseph S.; Curi, Michael A.; et al. (1 January 2008). "Expert Consensus Document on the Treatment of Descending Thoracic Aortic Disease Using Endovascular Stent-grafts". The Annals of Thoracic Surgery. 85 (1 Suppl). Netherlands: Elsevier: S1–S41. doi:10.1016/j.athoracsur.2007.10.099. ISSN 0003-4975. PMID 18083364.
- Svensson, Lars G.; Crawford, E. Stanley; Hess, Kenneth R.; Coselli, Joseph S.; Raskin, Steven; Shenaq, Salwa A.; et al. (1 July 1993). "Deep Hypothermia with Circulatory Arrest: Determinants of Stroke and Early Mortality in 656 Patients" (PDF). The Journal of Thoracic and Cardiovascular Surgery. 106 (1). Elsevier: 19–28, discussion 28-31. doi:10.1016/S0022-5223(19)33737-7. ISSN 0022-5223. PMID 8321002.
- Guo, Dong-Chuan; Pannu, Hariyadarshi; Tran-Fadulu, Van; Papke, Christina L.; Yu, Robert K.; Avidan, Nili; et al. (11 November 2007). "Mutations in Smooth Muscle Alpha-actin (ACTA2) Lead to Thoracic Aortic Aneurysms and Dissections". Nature Genetics. 39 (12). United States: Nature Publishing Group: 1488–1493. doi:10.1038/ng.2007.6. ISSN 1546-1718. PMID 17994018. S2CID 62785801.
