= Abdominal aortic aneurysm =

Localized enlargement of the abdominal aorta

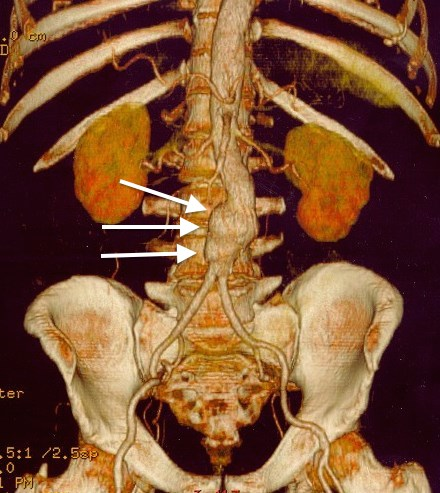
- CT reconstruction image of an abdominal aortic aneurysm (white arrows)
- Specialty: Vascular surgery, interventional radiology
- Symptoms: None, abdominal, back, or leg pain
- Usual onset: Over-50-year-old males
- Risk factors: Smoking, hypertension, other cardiovascular disease, family history, Marfan syndrome
- Diagnostic method: Medical imaging (abdominal aorta diameter > 3 cm)
- Prevention: Not smoking, treating risk factors
- Treatment: Surgery (open surgery or endovascular aneurysm repair)
- Frequency: ~5% (males over 65 years)
- Deaths: 168,200 aortic aneurysms (2015)

Abdominal aortic aneurysm (AAA) is a localized enlargement of the abdominal aorta such that the diameter is greater than 3 cm (1.2 in) or more than 50% larger than normal. An AAA usually causes no symptoms, except during rupture. Occasionally, abdominal, back, or leg pain may occur. Large aneurysms can sometimes be felt by pushing on the abdomen. Rupture may result in pain in the abdomen or back, low blood pressure, or loss of consciousness, and often results in death.

AAAs occur most commonly in men, those over 50, and those with a family history of the disease. Additional risk factors include smoking, high blood pressure, and other heart or blood vessel diseases. Genetic conditions with an increased risk include Marfan syndrome and Ehlers–Danlos syndrome. AAAs are the most common form of aortic aneurysm. About 85% occur below the kidneys, with the rest either at the level of or above the kidneys. In the United States, screening with abdominal ultrasound is recommended for males between 65 and 75 years of age with a history of smoking. In the United Kingdom and Sweden, screening all men over 65 is recommended. Once an aneurysm is found, further ultrasounds are typically done regularly because aneurysms grow, and monitoring to identify when an aneurysm meets a threshold for repair

Abstinence from cigarette smoking is the single best way to prevent the disease. Other methods of prevention include treating high blood pressure, treating high blood cholesterol, and avoiding being overweight. Surgery is usually recommended when the diameter of an AAA grows to >5.5 cm in males and >5.0 cm in females. Other reasons for repair include symptoms and a rapid increase in size, defined as more than one centimeter per year. Repair may be either by open surgery or endovascular aneurysm repair (EVAR). As compared to open surgery, EVAR has a lower risk of death in the short term and a shorter hospital stay, but may not always be an option. There does not appear to be a difference in longer-term outcomes between the two. Repeat procedures are more common with EVAR.

AAAs affect 2–8% of males over the age of 65. They are five times more common in men. In those with an aneurysm less than 5.5 cm, the risk of rupture in the next year is below 1%. Among those with an aneurysm between 5.5 and 7 cm, the risk is about 10%, while for those with an aneurysm greater than 7 cm the risk is about 33%. Mortality if ruptured is 85% to 90%. Globally, aortic aneurysms resulted in 168,200 deaths in 2013, up from 100,000 in 1990. In the United States AAAs resulted in between 10,000 and 18,000 deaths in 2009.

== Signs and symptoms ==
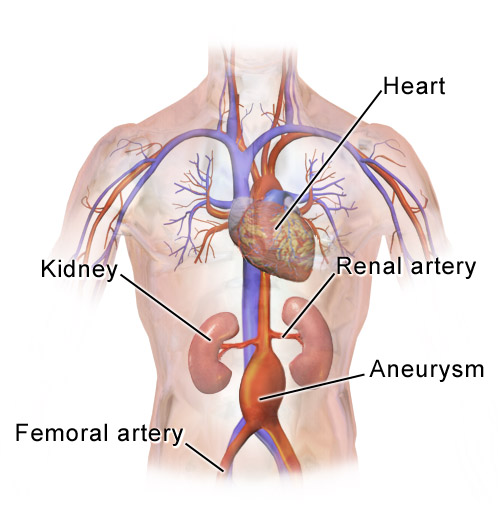
Abdominal aortic aneurysm location

The vast majority of aneurysms are asymptomatic. However, as the abdominal aorta expands and/or ruptures, the aneurysm may become painful and lead to pulsating sensations in the abdomen or pain in the chest, lower back, legs, or scrotum.

=== Complications ===
The complications include rupture, peripheral embolization, acute aortic occlusion, and aortocaval (between the aorta and inferior vena cava) or aortoduodenal (between the aorta and the duodenum) fistulae. On physical examination, a palpable and pulsatile abdominal mass can be noted. Bruits can be present in case of renal or visceral arterial stenosis.

The signs and symptoms of a ruptured AAA may include severe pain in the lower back, flank, abdomen, or groin. A mass that pulses with the heartbeat may also be felt. The bleeding can lead to a hypovolemic shock with low blood pressure and a fast heart rate, which may cause fainting. The mortality of AAA rupture is as high as 90 percent. 65 to 75 percent of patients die before they arrive at the hospital and up to 90 percent die before they reach the operating room. The bleeding can be retroperitoneal or into the abdominal cavity. Rupture can also create a connection between the aorta and intestine or inferior vena cava. Flank ecchymosis (appearance of a bruise) is a sign of retroperitoneal bleeding and is also called Grey Turner's sign.

== Causes ==
The exact causes of the degenerative process remain unclear. There are, however, some hypotheses and well-defined risk factors.

- Tobacco smoking: More than 90% of people who develop an AAA have smoked at some point in their lives.
- Alcohol and hypertension: The inflammation caused by prolonged use of alcohol and hypertensive effects from abdominal edema which leads to hemorrhoids, esophageal varices, and other conditions, is also considered a long-term cause of AAA.
- Genetic influences: The influence of genetic factors is high. AAA is four to six times more common in male siblings of known patients, with a risk of 20–30%. The high familial prevalence rate is most notable in male individuals. There are many hypotheses about the exact genetic disorder that could cause a higher incidence of AAA among male members of the affected families. Some have presumed that the influence of alpha 1-antitrypsin deficiency could be crucial, while other experimental works favor the hypothesis of X-linked mutation, which would explain the lower incidence in heterozygous females. Other hypotheses of genetic causes have also been formulated. Connective tissue disorders, such as Marfan syndrome, Ehlers-Danlos syndrome and Loeys-Dietz syndrome, have also been strongly associated with AAA. Both relapsing polychondritis and pseudoxanthoma elasticum may cause abdominal aortic aneurysm.
- Atherosclerosis: The AAA was long considered to be caused by atherosclerosis because the walls of the AAA frequently carry an atherosclerotic burden. However, this hypothesis cannot explain the initial defect and the development of occlusion, which is observed in the process. Another hypothesis is that plaque buildup can cause a feed-forward dysfunction in the signaling among neurons that regulate pressure in the aorta. This feed-forward process leads to an over-pressuring condition that ruptures the aorta.
- Other causes of the development of AAA include: infection, trauma, arteritis, and cystic medial necrosis.

== Pathophysiology ==
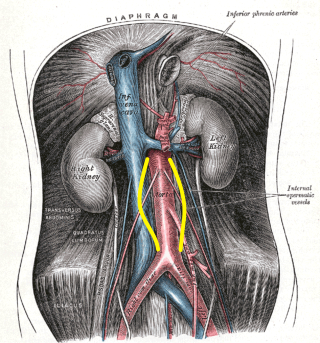
A plate from Gray's Anatomy with yellow lines depicting the most common infrarenal location of the AAA

3D file showing an aortic aneurysm

The most striking histopathological changes of the aneurysmatic aorta are seen in the tunica media and intima layers. These changes include the accumulation of lipids in foam cells, extracellular free cholesterol crystals, calcifications, thrombosis, and ulcerations and ruptures of the layers. Adventitial inflammatory infiltrate is present. However, the degradation of the tunica media by means of a proteolytic process seems to be the basic pathophysiologic mechanism of AAA development. Some researchers report increased expression and activity of matrix metalloproteinases in individuals with AAA. This leads to the elimination of elastin from the media, rendering the aortic wall more susceptible to the influence of blood pressure. Other reports have suggested the serine protease granzyme B may contribute to aortic aneurysm rupture through the cleavage of decorin, leading to disrupted collagen organization and reduced tensile strength of the adventitia. There is also a reduced amount of vasa vasorum in the abdominal aorta (compared to the thoracic aorta); consequently, the tunica media must rely mostly on diffusion for nutrition, which makes it more susceptible to damage.

Hemodynamics affect the development of AAA, which has a predilection for the infrarenal aorta. The histological structure and mechanical characteristics of the infrarenal aorta differ from those of the thoracic aorta. The diameter decreases from the root to the aortic bifurcation, and the wall of the infrarenal aorta also contains a lesser proportion of elastin. The mechanical tension in the abdominal aortic wall is therefore higher than in the thoracic aortic wall. The elasticity and distensibility also decline with age, which can result in gradual dilatation of the segment. Higher intraluminal pressure in patients with arterial hypertension markedly contributes to the progression of the pathological process. Suitable hemodynamic conditions may be linked to specific intraluminal thrombus (ILT) patterns along the aortic lumen, which in turn may affect AAA's development.

== Diagnosis ==
An abdominal aortic aneurysm is usually diagnosed by physical exam, abdominal ultrasound, or CT scan. Plain abdominal radiographs may show the outline of an aneurysm when its walls are calcified. However, the outline will be visible by X-ray in less than half of all aneurysms. Ultrasonography is used to screen for aneurysms and to determine their size if present. Additionally, free peritoneal fluid can be detected. It is non-invasive and sensitive, but the presence of bowel gas or obesity may limit its usefulness. CT scan has nearly 100% sensitivity for an aneurysm and is also useful in preoperative planning, detailing the anatomy and possibility for endovascular repair. In the case of suspected rupture, it can also reliably detect retroperitoneal fluid. Alternative less often used methods for visualization of an aneurysm include MRI and angiography.

An aneurysm ruptures if the mechanical stress (tension per area) exceeds the local wall strength; consequently, peak wall stress (PWS), mean wall stress (MWS), and peak wall rupture risk (PWRR) are more reliable parameters than diameter to assess AAA rupture risk. Medical software allows computing these rupture risk indices from standard clinical CT data and provides a patient-specific AAA rupture risk diagnosis. This type of biomechanical approach has been shown to accurately predict the location of AAA rupture.

Aortic measurement on abdominal ultrasonography in the axial plane between the outer margins of the aortic wall

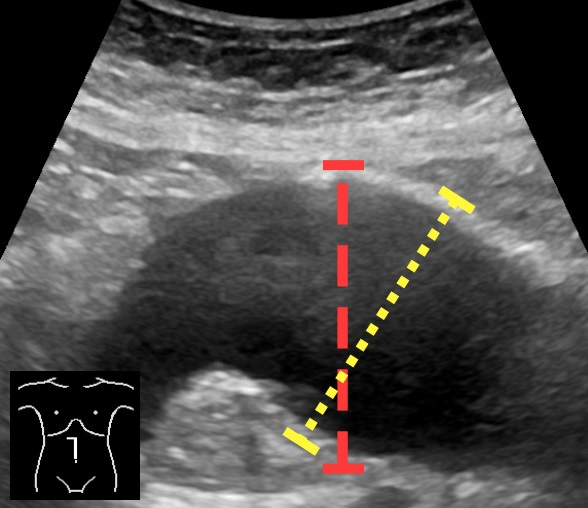
Ultrasonography in the sagittal plane, showing axial plane measure (dashed red line), as well as maximal diameter (dotted yellow line), which is preferred

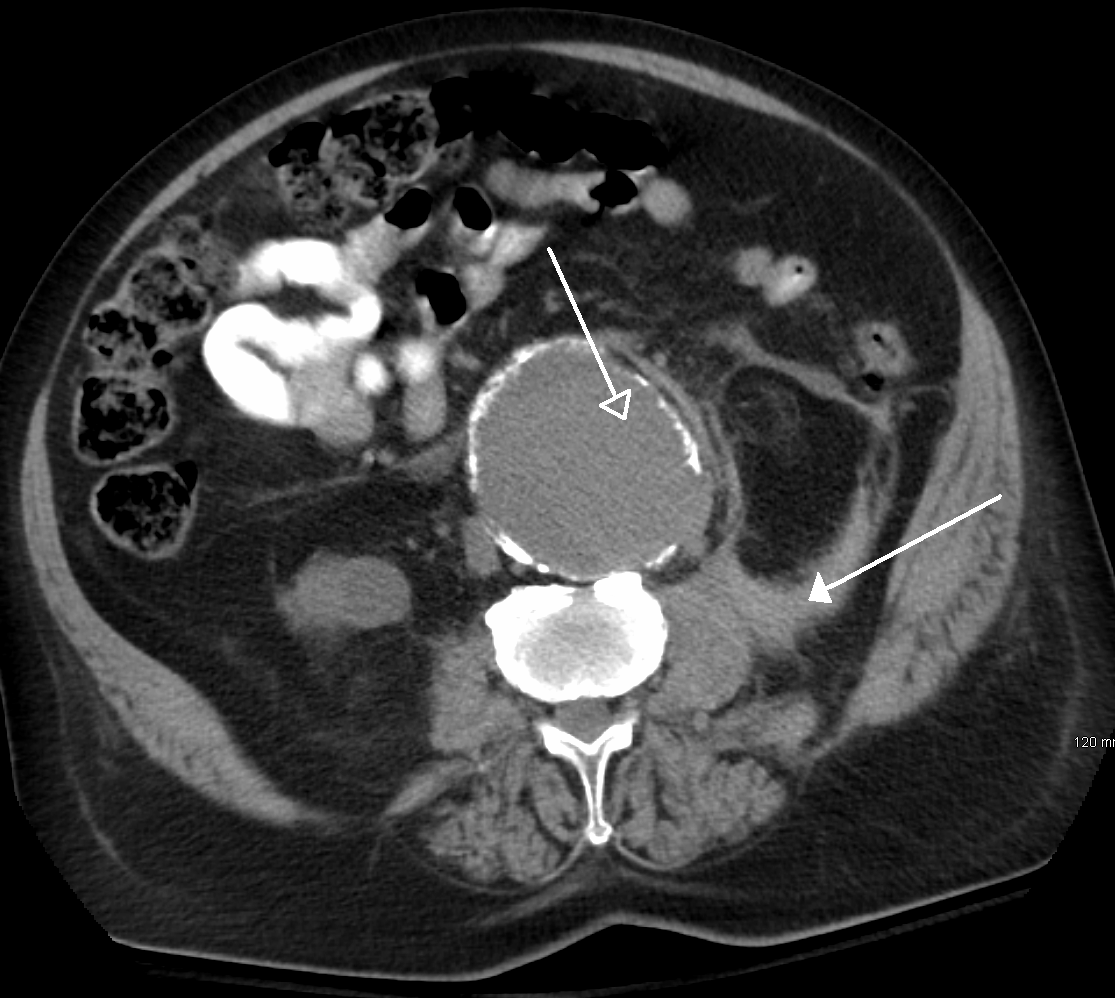
A ruptured AAA with an open arrow marking the aneurysm and the closed arrow marking the free blood in the abdomen

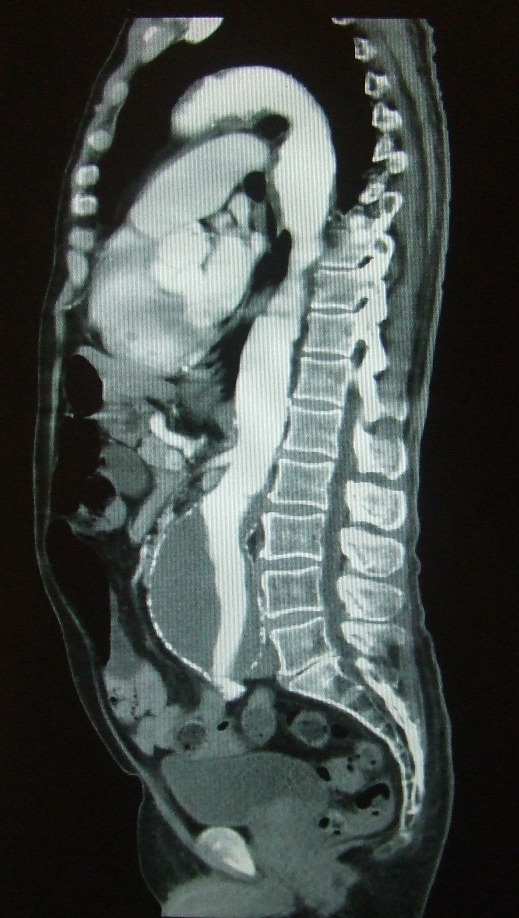
Sagittal CT image of an AAA

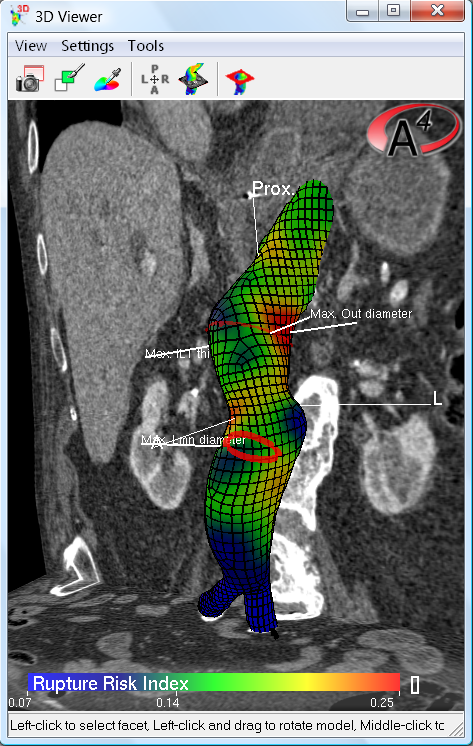
Biomechanical AAA rupture risk prediction

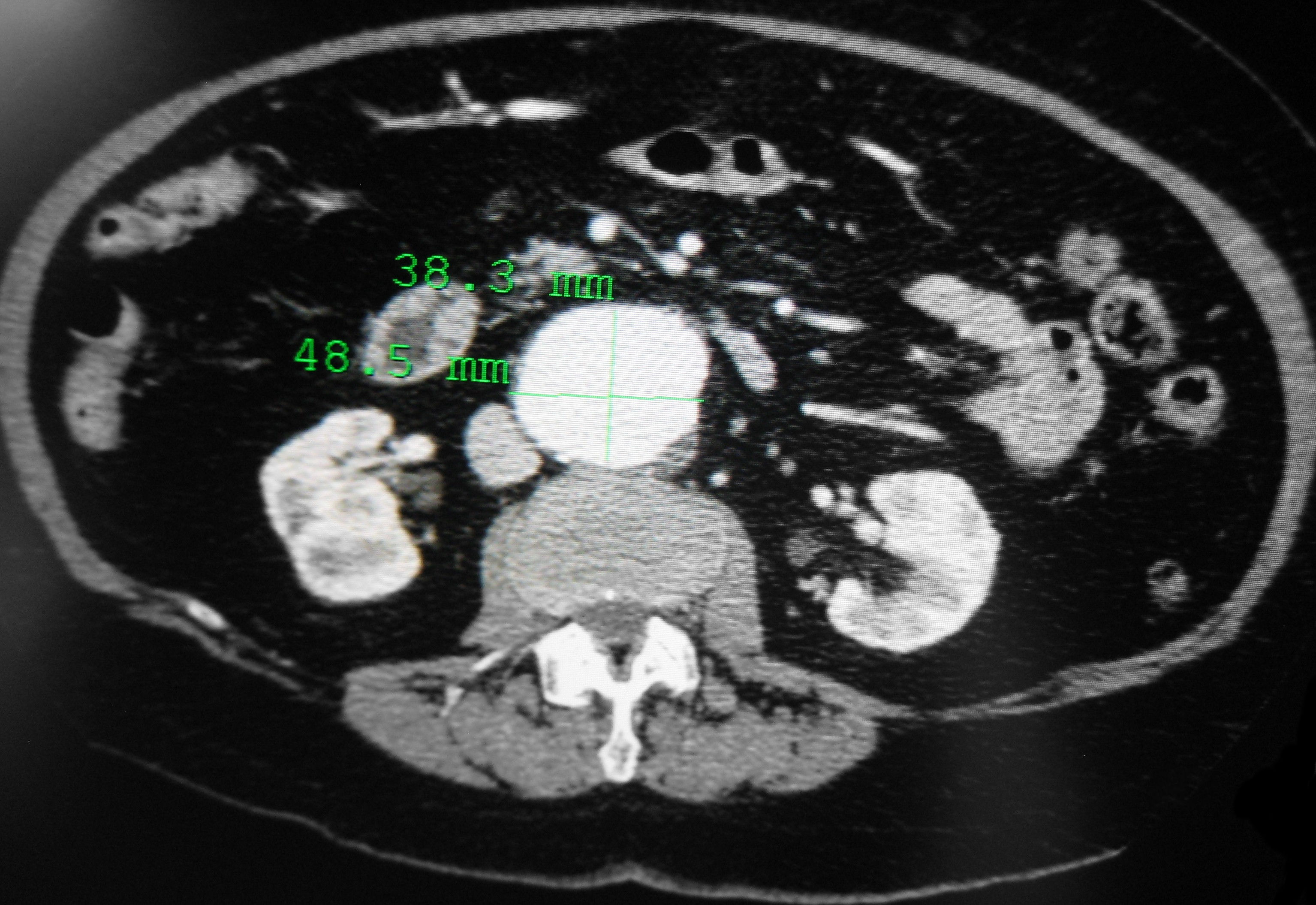
An axial contrast-enhanced CT scan demonstrating an abdominal aortic aneurysm of 4.8 by 3.8 cm

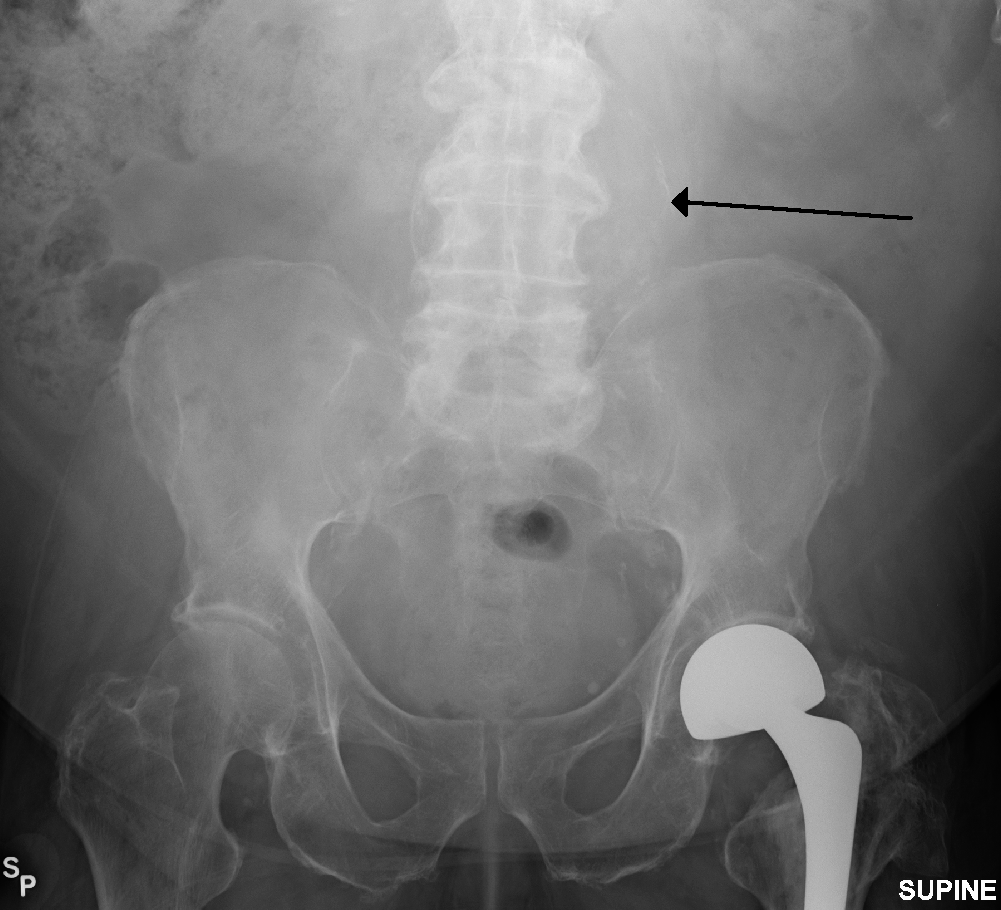
The faint outline of the calcified wall of an AAA as seen on a plain X-ray

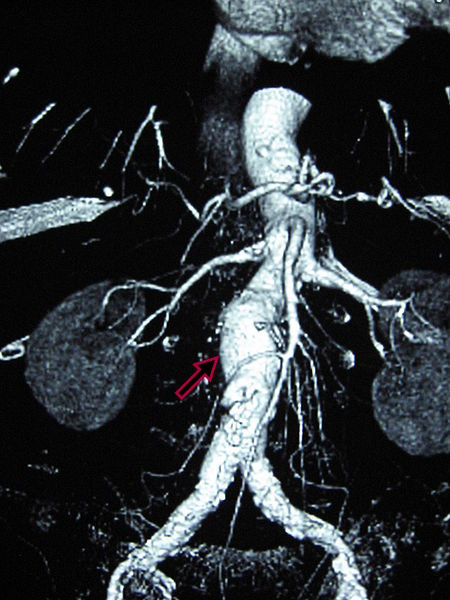
Abdominal aortic aneurysms (3.4 cm)

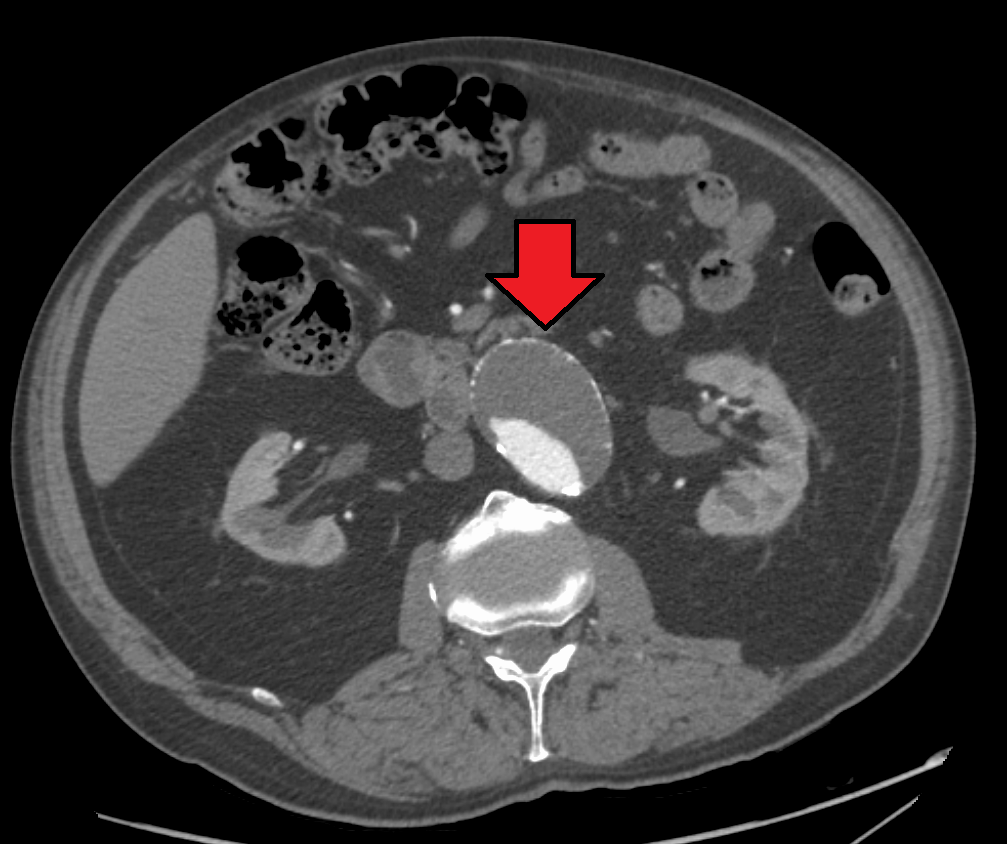
An aortic aneurysm as seen on CT with a small area of remaining blood flow

Ultrasound showing a previously repaired AAA that is leaking with flow around the graft

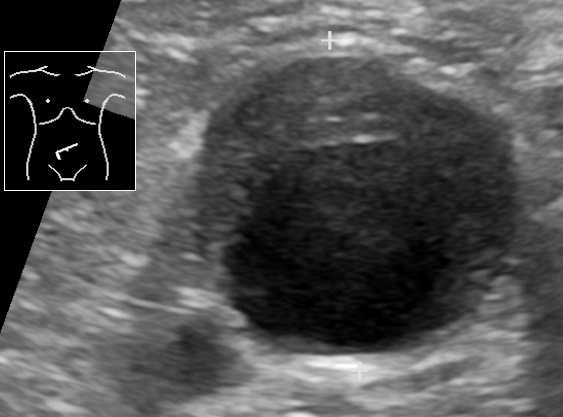
Ultrasonography of an aneurysm with a mural thrombus

=== Classification ===
Size classification
Ectatic or mild dilatation	>2.0 cm and <3.0 cm
Moderate	3.0–5.0 cm
Large or severe	>5.0 or 5.5 cm

Abdominal aortic aneurysms are commonly divided according to their size and symptomatology. An aneurysm is usually defined as an outer aortic diameter over 3 cm (normal diameter of the aorta is around 2 cm), or more than 50% of normal diameter. If the outer diameter exceeds 5.5 cm, the aneurysm is considered to be large. Ruptured AAA should be suspected in any person older than 60 who experiences collapse, unexplained low blood pressure, or sudden-onset back or abdominal pain. Abdominal pain, shock, and a pulsatile mass are only present in a minority of cases. Although an unstable person with a known aneurysm may undergo surgery without further imaging, the diagnosis will usually be confirmed using CT or ultrasound scanning.

The suprarenal aorta normally measures about 0.5 cm larger than the infrarenal aorta.

=== Differential diagnosis ===
Aortic aneurysm rupture may be mistaken for the pain of kidney stones, or muscle related back pain.

== Prevention ==
In terms of prevention, the following are effective measures to reduce the risk of developing a AAA:

- Smoking cessation
- Treatment of hypertension

== Screening ==
Repeat ultrasound frequency after diagnosis
AAA size in cm	SVS (2018)	ESVS (2024)		RESCAN (2013)
AAA size in cm	SVS (2018)	Men	Women	RESCAN (2013)
2.5–2.9	10 years	5 years		—N/a
3.0–3.9	3 years	3 years		2 to 3 years
4.0–4.4	1 year	1 year		1 to 2 years
4.5–4.9	1 year		6 months	1 year
5.0–5.4	6 months		Surgery	6 months

The U.S. Preventive Services Task Force (USPSTF) recommends a single screening abdominal ultrasound for abdominal aortic aneurysm in males aged 65 to 75 years who have a history of smoking. Among this group who does not smoke, screening may be selective. It is unclear if screening is useful in women who have smoked and the USPSTF recommends against screening in women who have never smoked.

In the United Kingdom, the NHS AAA Screening Programme invites men in England for screening during the year they turn 65. Men over 65 can contact the programme to arrange to be screened.

In Sweden one time screening is recommended in all males over 65 years of age. This has been found to decrease the risk of death from AAA by 42% with a number needed to screen just over 200. In those with a close relative diagnosed with an aortic aneurysm, Swedish guidelines recommend an ultrasound at around 60 years of age.

Australia has no guideline on screening.

Repeat ultrasounds should be carried out in those who have an aortic size greater than 3.0 cm. Although recommendations vary between guidelines, in those whose aorta is between 3.0 and 3.9 cm this may be every three years, if between 4.0 and 4.4 cm every two years, and if between 4.5 and 5.4 cm every year.

== Management ==
The treatment options for asymptomatic AAA are conservative management, surveillance with a view to eventual repair, and immediate repair. Two modes of repair are available for an AAA: open aneurysm repair, and endovascular aneurysm repair (EVAR). An intervention is often recommended if the aneurysm grows more than 1 cm per year or it is bigger than 5.5 cm. Repair is also indicated for symptomatic aneurysms. Ten years after open AAA repair, the overall survival rate was 59%. Mycotic abdominal aorta aneurysm (MAAA) is a rare and life-threatening condition. Because of its rarity, there is a lack of adequately powered studies and consensus on its treatment and follow-up. A management protocol on the management of mycotic abdominal aortic aneurysm was recently published in the Annals of Vascular Surgery by Premnath et al.

=== Conservative ===
Conservative management is indicated in people where repair carries a high mortality risk and in patients where repair is unlikely to improve life expectancy. The mainstay of the conservative treatment is smoking cessation.

Surveillance is indicated in small asymptomatic aneurysms (less than 5.5 cm) where the risk of repair exceeds the risk of rupture. As an AAA grows in diameter, the risk of rupture increases. Surveillance until an aneurysm has reached a diameter of 5.5 cm has not been shown to have a higher risk as compared to early intervention.

=== Medication ===
No medical therapy has been proven to be effective at decreasing the growth rate or rupture rate of asymptomatic AAAs, though observational data suggest statins may attenuate both growth rate and risk of surgery. Blood pressure and lipids should, however, be treated per usual. The use of statins in moderate or high intensity in patients with atherosclerotic AAAs reduces the risk of adverse events such as myocardial infarction and stroke.

=== Surgery ===
The threshold for repair varies slightly from individual to individual, depending on the balance of risks and benefits when considering repair versus ongoing surveillance. The size of an individual's native aorta may influence this, along with the presence of comorbidities that increase operative risk or decrease life expectancy.

Evidence, however, favors elective repair if the AAA size is greater than 5.5 cm in men and 5.0 cm in women. Surgery is usually recommended for symptomatic patients. Limited evidence suggests intervention in case of saccular aneurysms, as their shape may result in earlier rupture, as well as rapidly-growing AAAs (≥0.5 cm in 6 months or ≥1 cm in one year).

==== Open repair ====
Open repair is indicated in young patients as an elective procedure, or in growing or large, symptomatic or ruptured aneurysms. The aorta must be clamped during the repair, denying blood to the abdominal organs and sections of the spinal cord; this can cause a range of complications. As it is essential to perform the critical part of the operation quickly, the incision is typically made large enough to facilitate the fastest repair. Recovery after open AAA surgery takes significant time. The minimums are a few days in intensive care, a week total in the hospital, and a few months before full recovery.

==== Endovascular repair ====
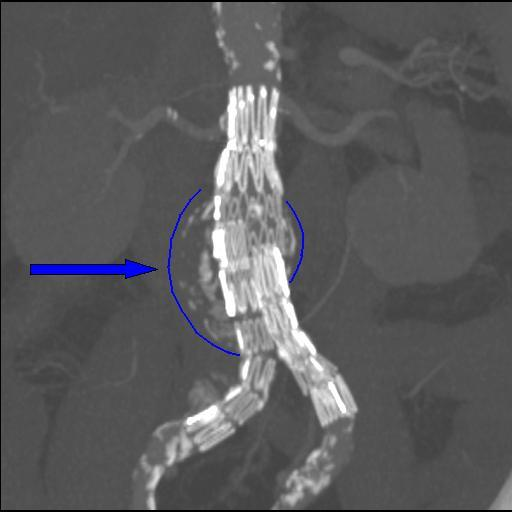
Abdominal aortic endoprosthesis, CT scan, original aneurysm marked in blue

Endovascular repair first became practical in the 1990s and although it is now an established alternative to open repair, its role is yet to be clearly defined. It is generally indicated in older, high-risk patients or patients unfit for open repair. However, endovascular repair is feasible for only a portion of AAAs, depending on the morphology of the aneurysm. The main advantages over open repair are that there is less peri-operative mortality, less time in intensive care, less time in hospital overall, and an earlier return to normal activity. Disadvantages of endovascular repair include a requirement for more frequent ongoing hospital reviews and a higher chance of further required procedures. According to the latest studies, the EVAR procedure does not offer any benefit for overall survival or health-related quality of life compared to open surgery, although aneurysm-related mortality is lower. In patients unfit for open repair, EVAR plus conservative management was associated with no benefit, more complications, subsequent procedures and higher costs compared to conservative management alone. Endovascular treatment for paraanastomotic aneurysms after aortobiiliac reconstruction is also a possibility. A 2017 Cochrane review found tentative evidence of no difference in outcomes between endovascular and open repair of ruptured AAA in the first month.

=== Rupture ===
In those with aortic rupture of the AAA, treatment is immediate surgical repair. There appear to be benefits to allowing permissive hypotension and limiting the use of intravenous fluids during transport to the operating room.

== Prognosis ==
AAA Size (cm)	Growth rate (cm/yr)	Annual rupture risk (%)
3.0–3.9	0.39	0
4.0–4.9	0.36	0.5–5
5.0–5.9	0.43	3–15
6.0–6.9	0.64	10–20
>=7.0	-	20–50

Although the current standard of determining rupture risk is based on maximum diameter, it is known that smaller AAAs that fall below this threshold (diameter<5.5 cm) may also rupture, and larger AAAs (diameter>5.5 cm) may remain stable. In one report, it was shown that 10–24% of ruptured AAAs were less than 5 cm in diameter. It has also been reported that of 473 non-repaired AAAs examined from autopsy reports, there were 118 cases of rupture, 13% of which were less than 5 cm in diameter. This study also showed that 60% of the AAAs greater than 5 cm (including 54% of those AAAs between 7.1 and 10 cm) never experienced rupture. Vorp et al. later deduced from the findings of Darling et al. that if the maximum diameter criterion were followed for the 473 subjects, only 7% (34/473) of cases would have died from rupture before surgical intervention as the diameter was less than 5 cm, with 25% (116/473) of cases possibly undergoing unnecessary surgery since these AAAs may never have ruptured.

Alternative methods of rupture assessment have been recently reported. The majority of these approaches involve the numerical analysis of AAAs using the common engineering technique of the finite element method (FEM) to determine the wall stress distributions. Recent reports have shown that these stress distributions have been shown to correlate to the overall geometry of the AAA rather than solely to the maximum diameter. It is also known that wall stress alone does not completely govern failure as an AAA will usually rupture when the wall stress exceeds the wall strength. In light of this, rupture assessment may be more accurate if the patient-specific wall stress is coupled together with patient-specific wall strength. A noninvasive method of determining patient-dependent wall strength was recently reported, with more traditional approaches to strength determination via tensile testing performed by other researchers in the field. Some of the more recently proposed AAA rupture-risk assessment methods include: AAA wall stress; AAA expansion rate; degree of asymmetry; presence of intraluminal thrombus (ILT); a rupture potential index (RPI); a finite element analysis rupture index (FEARI); biomechanical factors coupled with computer analysis; growth of ILT; geometrical parameters of the AAA; and also a method of determining AAA growth and rupture based on mathematical models.

Machine learning models are being investigated to improve predictions of rupture risk and the need for surgical repair, with the aim of enabling more individualised management recommendations. Such tools could be particularly impactful in countries with established screening programmes.

The postoperative mortality for an already ruptured AAA has slowly decreased over several decades but remains higher than 40%. However, if the AAA is surgically repaired before rupture, the postoperative mortality rate is substantially lower, approximately 1-6%.

== Epidemiology ==
The occurrence of AAA varies by ethnicity. In the United Kingdom, the rate of AAA in Caucasian men older than 65 years is about 4.7%, while in Asian men it is 0.45%. It is also less common in individuals of African, and Hispanic heritage. They occur four times more often in men than in women.

There are at least 13,000 deaths yearly in the U.S. secondary to AAA rupture. The peak number of new cases per year among males is around 70 years of age, and the percentage of males affected over 60 years is 2–6%. The frequency is much higher in smokers than in non-smokers (8:1), and the risk decreases slowly after smoking cessation. In the U.S., the incidence of AAA is 2–4% in the adult population.

Rupture of the AAA occurs in 1–3% of men aged 65 or more, for whom the mortality rate is 70–95%.

== History ==
The first historical records about AAA are from Ancient Rome in the 2nd century AD, when Greek surgeon Antyllus tried to treat the AAA with proximal and distal ligature, central incision and removal of thrombotic material from the aneurysm. However, attempts to treat the AAA surgically were unsuccessful until 1923. In that year, Rudolph Matas (who also proposed the concept of endoaneurysmorrhaphy), performed the first successful aortic ligation on a human. Other methods that were successful in treating the AAA included wrapping the aorta with polyethene cellophane, which induced fibrosis and restricted the growth of the aneurysm. Endovascular aneurysm repair was first performed in the late 1980s and has been widely adopted in the subsequent decades. Endovascular repair was first used for treating a ruptured aneurysm in Nottingham in 1994.

== Society and culture ==
Theoretical physicist Albert Einstein underwent an operation for an abdominal aortic aneurysm in 1949 that was performed by Rudolph Nissen, who wrapped the aorta with polyethylene cellophane. Einstein's aneurysm ruptured on April 13, 1955. He declined surgery, saying, "I want to go when I want. It is tasteless to prolong life artificially. I have done my share, it is time to go. I will do it elegantly." He died five days later at age 76.

French general and statesman Charles de Gaulle died suddenly from an abdominal aortic aneurysm while watching the news on television on the evening of November 9, 1970, less than 2 weeks before his 80th birthday.

Actor John Banner, January 28, 1910 – January 28, 1973, famous for portraying Sgt. Shultz on Hogan's Heroes, died from an abdominal aortic aneurysm on his 63rd birthday while visiting friends in Vienna.

Actress Lucille Ball died on April 26, 1989, from an abdominal aortic aneurysm. At the time of her death, she was in Cedars-Sinai Medical Center recovering from emergency surgery performed just six days earlier because of a dissecting aortic aneurysm near her heart. Ball was at increased risk as she had been a heavy smoker for decades.

Musician Conway Twitty died in June 1993 from an abdominal aortic aneurysm at the age of 59, two months before the release of what would be his final studio album, Final Touches.

Actor George C. Scott died in 1999, aged 71, from a ruptured abdominal aortic aneurysm.

In 2001, former presidential candidate Bob Dole underwent surgery for an abdominal aortic aneurysm in which a team led by vascular surgeon Kenneth Ouriel inserted a stent graft.

Actor Robert Jacks, who played Leatherface in Texas Chainsaw Massacre: The Next Generation, died from an abdominal aneurysm on August 8, 2001, one day shy of his 42nd birthday. When Jacks was a child, his father died from the same cause.

Actor Tommy Ford died of abdominal aneurysm in October 2016 at 52 years old.

Gary Gygax, co-creator of Dungeons & Dragons, died from an abdominal aortic aneurysm in 2008, at the age of 69.

Harvey Korman died on May 29, 2008, aged 81, as the result of complications from a ruptured abdominal aortic aneurysm he had suffered four months earlier.

== Research ==
=== Risk assessment ===
There have been many calls for alternative approaches to rupture risk assessment over the past number of years, with many believing that a biomechanics-based approach may be more suitable than the current diameter approach. Numerical modeling is a valuable tool to researchers allowing approximate wall stresses to be calculated, thus revealing the rupture potential of a particular aneurysm. Experimental models are required to validate these numerical results and provide further insight into the biomechanical behavior of the AAA. In vivo, AAAs exhibit a varying range of material strengths from localised weak hypoxic regions to much stronger regions and areas of calcifications.

Finding ways to predict future AAA growth is seen as a research priority.

Another related line of research is utilizing mathematical decision modeling (e.g., Markov decision processes) to determine improved treatment policies. Initial results suggest that a more dynamic policy could provide benefits, although such claims have not been clinically verified. A study recently showed that aneurysms can be accurately predicted as to whether they are stable (lacking repair or intervention), requiring repair, or at risk of rupture from scans years prior to any event based on a machine-learning based classification tool.

=== Experimental models ===
Experimental models can now be manufactured using a novel technique involving the injection-moulding lost-wax manufacturing process to create patient-specific anatomically correct AAA replicas. Work has also focused on developing more realistic material analogues to those in vivo, and recently a novel range of silicone-rubbers was created allowing the varying material properties of the AAA to be more accurately represented. These rubber models can also be used in a variety of experimental situations, from stress analysis using the photoelastic method New endovascular devices are being developed that are able to treat more complex and tortuous anatomies.

=== Prevention and treatment ===
An animal study showed that removing a single protein prevents early damage in blood vessels from triggering a later-stage, frequently lethal complication. By eliminating the gene for a signaling protein called cyclophilin A (CypA) from a strain of mice, researchers were able to provide complete protection against abdominal aortic aneurysm.

Other recent research identified Granzyme B (GZMB) (a protein-degrading enzyme) to be a potential target in the treatment of abdominal aortic aneurysms. Elimination of this enzyme in mice models both slowed the progression of aneurysms and improved survival.

=== Preclinical research ===
The mechanisms that lead to AAA development are still not completely understood at a cellular and molecular level. To better understand the pathophysiology of AAA, it is often necessary to use experimental animal models. It is often questioned how well these models translate to human disease. Even though no animal model exactly represents the human condition, all the existing ones focus on one different pathophysiological aspect of the disease. Combining the results from different animal models with clinical research can provide a better overview of the AAA pathophysiology. The most common animal models are rodents (mice and rats), although, for certain studies, such as testing preclinical devices or surgical procedures, large animal models (pig, sheep) are more frequently used. The rodent models of AAA can be classified according to different aspects. There are dissecting models vs non-dissecting models and genetically determined models vs chemically induced models. The most commonly used models are the angiotensin-II infusion into ApoE knockout mice (dissecting model, chemically induced), the calcium chloride model (non-dissecting, chemically induced), and the elastase model (non-dissecting, chemically induced model). A recent study has shown that β-Aminopropionitrile plus elastase application to abdominal aorta causes more severe aneurysm in mice as compared to elastase alone.
