= Aortic rupture =

Breakage of the aorta

- Aorta segments, with thoracic aorta in area marked in green.
- Specialty: Vascular surgery, cardiology, emergency medicine
- Symptoms: Abdominal pain, flank pain, or back pain
- Complications: Shock, anemia
- Usual onset: Acute
- Causes: Ruptured aortic aneurysm, trauma
- Treatment: Surgical repair
- Prognosis: Poor
- Deaths: Up to 90% of cases

Aortic rupture is the breakage of all walls of the aorta, the largest artery in the body. Aortic rupture is a rare, extremely dangerous condition that is considered a medical emergency. The most common cause is an abdominal aortic aneurysm that has ruptured spontaneously. Aortic rupture is distinct from aortic dissection, which is a tear through the inner wall of the aorta that can block the flow of blood through the aorta to the heart or abdominal organs.

An aortic rupture can be classified according to its cause into one of the following main types:

- Traumatic aortic rupture
- Aortic rupture secondary to an aortic aneurysm

== Signs and symptoms ==
Patients with an aortic rupture typically present with a sudden onset of severe pain. In ruptures involving the thoracic aorta, patients often experience acute chest pain that may radiate to the back, whereas involvement of the abdominal aorta more frequently results in pain localized to the abdomen, flank, or lower back. The rapid blood loss can lead to signs of shock, such as low blood pressure, rapid heartbeat, pallor, and even loss of consciousness. Because the clinical presentation may overlap with other vascular emergencies such as aortic dissection—timely diagnosis using imaging modalities (e.g. computed tomography) is critical to initiate appropriate management.

== Causes ==
Aortic rupture may result from several distinct etiologies. The most common mechanism involves the spontaneous rupture of an aneurysmal aorta; for example, weakening of the vessel wall due to an abdominal aortic aneurysm or thoracic aortic aneurysm can ultimately lead to rupture under elevated intraluminal pressure. In addition, aortic rupture may occur following blunt trauma, as seen in traumatic aortic rupture, where high-energy impacts from vehicle collisions or significant falls produce differential deceleration forces that tear the aortic wall. On rare occasions, iatrogenic injury during medical or surgical procedures can also precipitate aortic rupture.

== Diagnosis ==
Diagnosis of a ruptured abdominal aortic aneurysm (rAAA) is challenging, with a wrong diagnosis occurring in between 32 and 42 % of cases. Such errors further increase the mortality risk due to incorrect first response and treatment. In cases of misdiagnosis, aortic rupture is often mistaken for ureteric colic and myocardial infarction (MI).

=== Differential diagnosis ===
The primary differential diagnoses include cardiogenic shock, pleural effusion, pulmonary embolism, myocarditis, myocardial infarction, but may also encompass acute gastritis, appendicitis, diverticulitis, gallstones, peptic ulcer disease and urinary tract infection as well.

== Prevention ==
This involves 2 main strategies: managing lifestyle risks (to prevent an aneurysm from forming or growing), and medical screening to catch potential issues before they become emergent.

Lifestyle risks include:

- Tobacco use is the single strongest risk factor for aortic rupture.
- Blood pressure management: Hypertension is a significant risk factor.
- Weightlifting Caution, extremely heavy and strained weightlifting can trigger a rupture in a weakened aorta.
- Not using a seatbelt

Who should be screened?

- People aged 65-75 who have ever smoked
- People with a family history (especially if it's a first-degree relative)
- People with genetic factors: such as Marfan Syndrome, Ehlers-Danlos, or having a bicuspid aortic valve.

Medical interventions:

- Aspirin and statins: manage cholesterol and prevent atherosclerosis (hardening of the arteries) which can lead to many aortic issues.
- Beta-blockers: these can slow the heart rate and reduce the impact force on the aortic wall.

== Treatment ==
Treatments range according to the severity of the condition from monitoring to emergency surgical repair. Treatments include:

- Monitoring
- Medication
- Surgery
  - Endovascular aortic repair (EVAR/TEVAR)
  - Open-Surgical Repair
- Emergent treatment
  - Blood pressure control with IV medications to drop blood pressure to the lowest safety level.
  - Emergency surgery: An emergency EVAR or open repair.

== Prognosis ==
An aortic rupture is a catastrophic medical emergency. People rarely survive such an injury. Mortality from aortic rupture is up to 90%. 65–75% of patients die before they arrive at the hospital and up to 90% die before they reach the operating room. In non-emergent cases the survival rate is over 95%; for an emergent ruptured aorta it is between 50-70%.
