= Ron Waksman =

American cardiologist

Ron Waksman is a cardiologist. He is the Associate Director, Division of Cardiology, Washington Hospital Center (WHC) and professor of medicine (cardiology) at Georgetown University.

== Areas of interest ==
His current research interests include brachytherapy for restenosis prevention bioabsorbable/ biodegradable stents, HDL therapy, intracoronary imaging, valvular heart disease and catheter-based treatment of renal denervation. He is also the author/co-author of more than 20 book chapters and the editor/co-editor of six books in the field of cardiology. He serves as the Editor-in-Chief of the journal Cardiovascular Revascularization Medicine (Including Molecular Interventions).

== Education ==
Ron Waksman earned his medical degree from the Ben Gurion University in Israel and completed residencies in medicine, cardiology, and interventional cardiology at Hadassah University in Jerusalem, Israel. Subsequently Waksman completed his fellowship in interventional cardiology in 1994 at Emory University Hospital Midtown in Atlanta, GA under Spencer B. King, III.

== Certifications ==
- Educational Commission for Foreign Medical Graduates
- Israeli Board in Internal Medicine
- Israeli Board in Cardiology
- Interventional Cardiology (Emory)
- American Board of Internal Medicine

== Professional societies ==
- Israel Cardiac Society
- American College of Cardiology (Fellow of the American College of Cardiology)
- Radiation Vascular Investigative Protocol Group
- The Society for Cardiac Angiography and Interventions Board of Trustees
- AHA Council on Atherosclerosis, Thrombosis and Vascular Biology
