= Aortic valve repair =

Treatment of aortic regurgitation

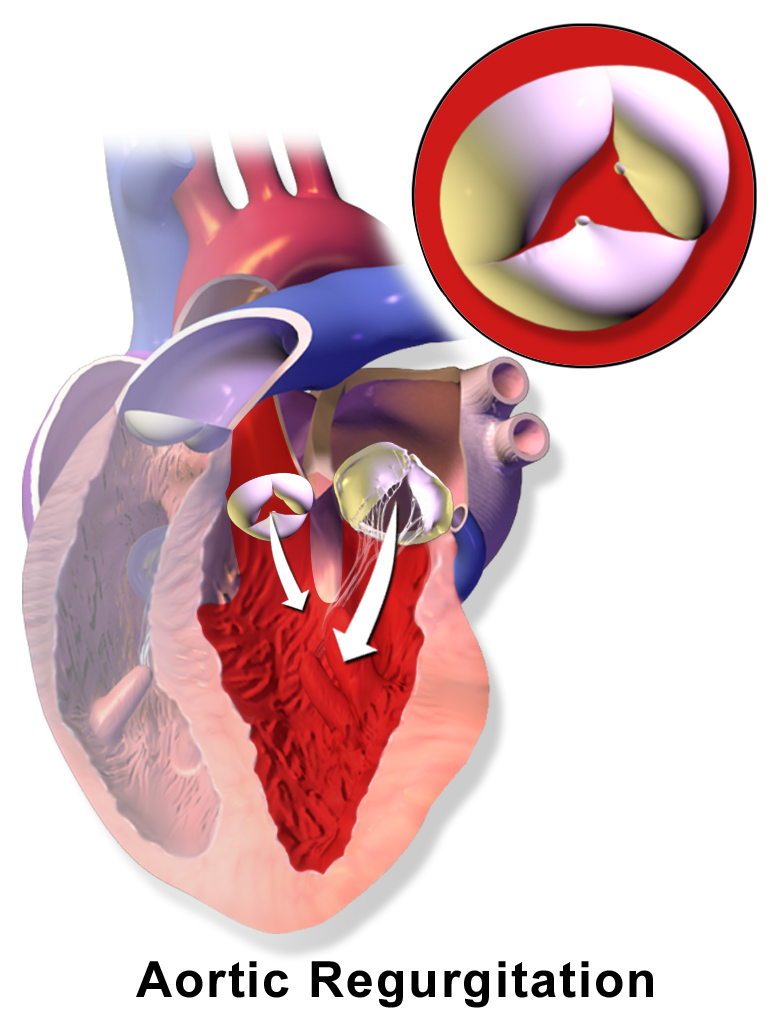
- In aortic regurgitation the cusps do not close completely during the filling phase of the heart (diastole), there is backflow of blood into the left ventricle.
- Other names: Aortic valve reconstruction
- Specialty: Cardiology
- ICD-9-CM: 35.9

Aortic valve repair or aortic valve reconstruction is the reconstruction of both form and function of a dysfunctional aortic valve. Most frequently it is used for the treatment of aortic regurgitation. It can also become necessary for the treatment of aortic aneurysm, less frequently for congenital aortic stenosis.

== Background ==
An aortic valve repair is most feasible in the absence of calcification or shrinking (retraction) of the aortic valve. Thus, while congenital (primary) aortic stenosis may be treated by aortic valve repair, an acquired (secondary) aortic stenosis is more likely to require a complete valve replacement. In most instances, aortic valve repair is performed for aortic regurgitation (insufficiency). Aortic valve repair may also be performed in the treatment of aortic aneurysm or aortic dissection if either aneurysm or dissection involves the aorta close to the valve.

Indications for aortic valve repair include:

- Absence of relevant calcification
- Congenital and severe aortic stenosis with symptoms or decreased left ventricular function
- Severe aortic regurgitation and symptoms, or left ventricular enlargement (> 65 to 70 mm), or decreased left ventricular function (EF < 50%)
- Ascending aortic aneurysm > 55mm
- Ascending aortic aneurysm > 50mm and risk factors (e.g. high blood pressure)
- Ascending aortic aneurysm > 50mm and connective tissue disease
- Ascending aortic aneurysm > 50mm and risk factors and connective tissue disease

=== Repair versus replacement ===
The goal of the operation is the improvement of life expectancy and treatment of heart failure as the consequence of dysfunction of the aortic valve. The goal may also be to avert complications of the aorta (rupture or dissection) in the treatment of aneurysm. Repair is a more recent alternative to replacement; in many instances replacement will be the only realistic option because of severe destruction of the valve.

While replacement of the aortic valve is a safe and reproducible procedure it may still be associated with the long-term occurrence of so-called valve-related complications. The probability of these complications depends on the age of the patient and the type of operation. Typical complications are blood clot formation on the valve or dislodgment of thrombus (embolism); bleeding complications are commonly a consequence of "blood-thinning" medication needed to prevent clots (anticoagulation). Biologic/tissue replacement valves have a tendency to degenerate, and there is also an increased risk of infections of valve prosthesis (prosthetic valve endocarditis).

Compared to the results of valve replacement there will be a minimal tendency towards clot formation after aortic valve repair, and anticoagulation is commonly not necessary, thus minimizing the possibility of bleeding complications. The likelihood of infection of the repaired aortic valve is much lower compared to what is seen after aortic valve replacement. A repair procedure may not last forever, but in many instances the durability of an aortic valve repair will markedly exceed that of a biological prosthesis.

== Surgical technique ==
The details of the aortic valve repair procedure depend on the possibility of congenital malformation of the valve, the type and degree of secondary deformation, and the existence of an aortic aneurysm. The goal of the procedure is the restoration of a normal form of the aortic valve, which will then lead to near-normal function and good durability of the repair. A transesophageal echocardiogram during the operation and prior to the repair will be important to define the exact deformation of the aortic valve and thus the mechanism of regurgitation.

In order to best accommodate the complex geometry of the aortic valve, these procedures are generally performed through open-heart surgery. Minimally invasive procedures limit the ability to precisely judge the form of the aortic valve and will lead to a higher uncertainty regarding function and durability of aortic valve repair. As for aortic valve replacement, the heart-lung machine is usually connected to the patient via the aorta and the right atrium. The heart is arrested through cardioplegia, and the form of the aortic valve is carefully analyzed. Currently documented predicted values for certain aspects of the form of the aortic valve are available. Using these parameters and a good transesophageal echocardiogram, the precise mechanism of regurgitation can be determined in most cases.

=== Aortic valve stenosis ===
Congenital aortic valve stenosis can be treated by aortic valve repair if there is no relevant calcification. In this scenario the aortic valve will almost always be unicuspid and the valve configuration must be altered as part of the procedure in order to improve opening of the valve. Because of the unicuspid form of the valve the repair concept will be similar to that of the regurgitant unicuspid valve.

The traditional treatment of congenital aortic stenosis is balloon valvuloplasty or surgical commissurotomy. Both approaches will frequently not eliminate the narrowing of the valve; in addition, they will lead to a variable degree of aortic valve regurgitation which places an additional burden on the heart. In both interventions some of the valve tissue is opened; the peculiar form aspects of unicuspid aortic valves are not taken into consideration. The repair approach differs from commissurotomy mainly in that not only valve tissue is divided to improve opening, but also at least an additional commissure (suspension point of the valve) is created for the aortic valve. Thus, a bicuspid valve is created which results in near-normal function of the aortic valve.

The most reproducible concept is the creation of a bicuspid aortic valve with two normal commissures and two cusps. Tissue of the aortic valve is removed or detached from the aorta in places where it is clearly abnormal. The location of a second commissure of normal height is determined; using a patch or the original cusp tissue the cusps are then sutured to the aortic wall in order to create cusps of sufficient tissue and adequate form reaching the new commissure.

=== Aortic regurgitation ===
==== Tricuspid aortic valve ====
In tricuspid aortic valves the anatomy is principally normal; if there is an aneurysm of the ascending aorta the principles of aortic aneurysm will have to be applied. Without aneurysm, the cause of regurgitation is frequently stretching of one or two of the valve components (cusps). Such stretching can be combined with the presence of congenital tissue fenestrations. Additionally, enlargement of the aortic annulus can contribute to valve dysfunction. Shrinkage of the cusps is less frequent in industrial countries; this is currently not well treatable by repair.

In surgical treatment, the extent of cusp stretching is exactly determined and then corrected by sutures. Enlargement of the annulus requires its size reduction and stabilization by an annuloplasty. In the case of annular dilatation, the annulus has to be reduced; currently, the largest experience exists with a strong suture that is placed around the annulus and tied to the desired size. Stretching is corrected by plicating sutures to the point that all cusps have a normal configuration. At the end of the operation, the cusp margins should be at an identical height.

==== Bicuspid aortic valve ====
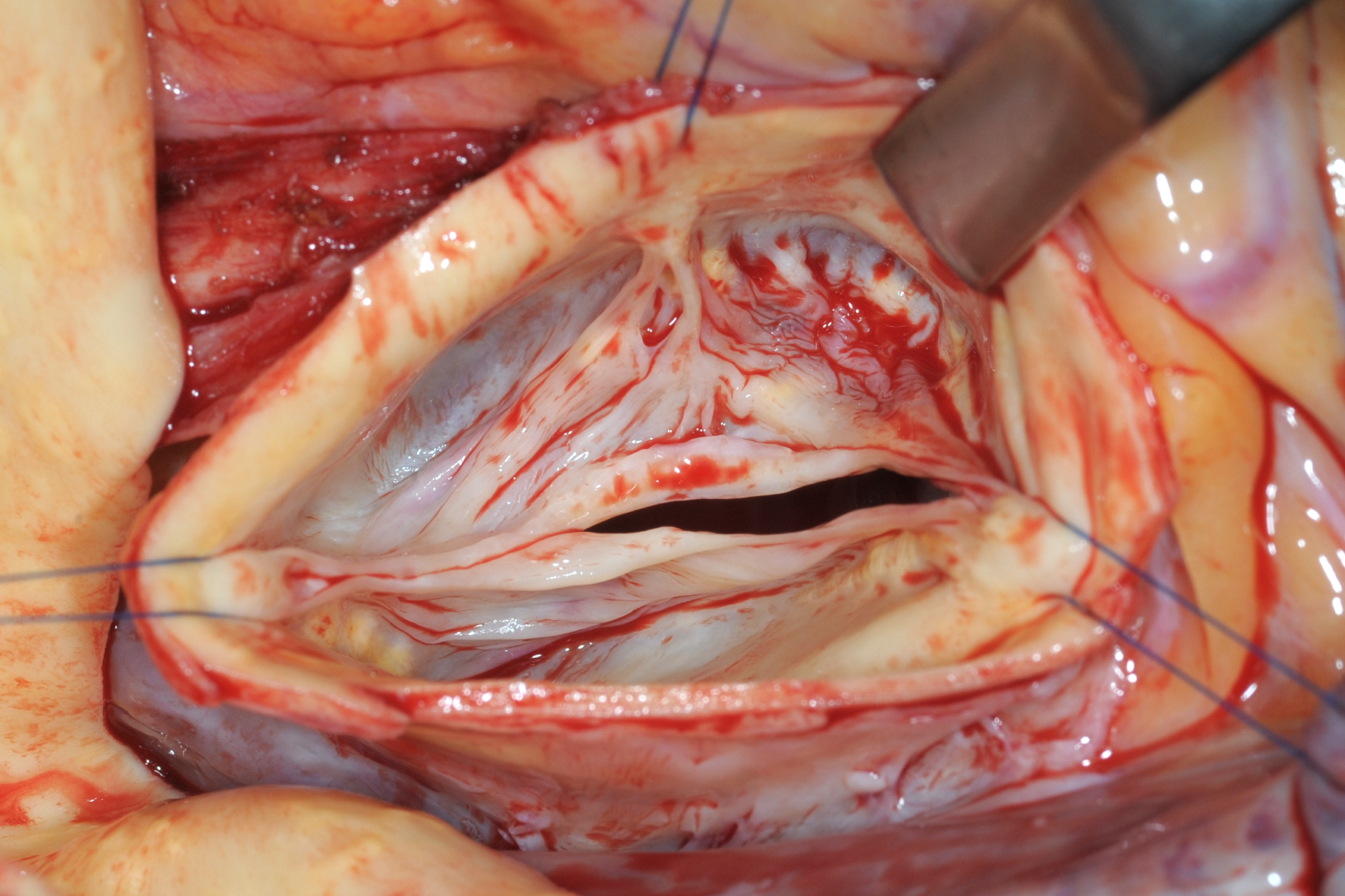
Bicuspid aortic valve which had to be operated on for severe regurgitation. Two of the cusps (upper side right and left) are grown together (fused) since birth. The lack of closure is seen in the central part of the valve, it is caused by stretching of the fused cusp.

In bicuspid aortic valve anatomy, there is congenital fusion of two cusps. This fused cusp is exposed to higher than normal stress and will stretch over time as a consequence. This results in aortic valve regurgitation. Annular enlargement is very frequent in this context, and it increases the tendency to leak. As a result of long-standing dysfunction also the normal cusp may undergo deformation and stretch. In half of the affected individuals there is also an aneurysm of the ascending aorta which has to be treated appropriately.

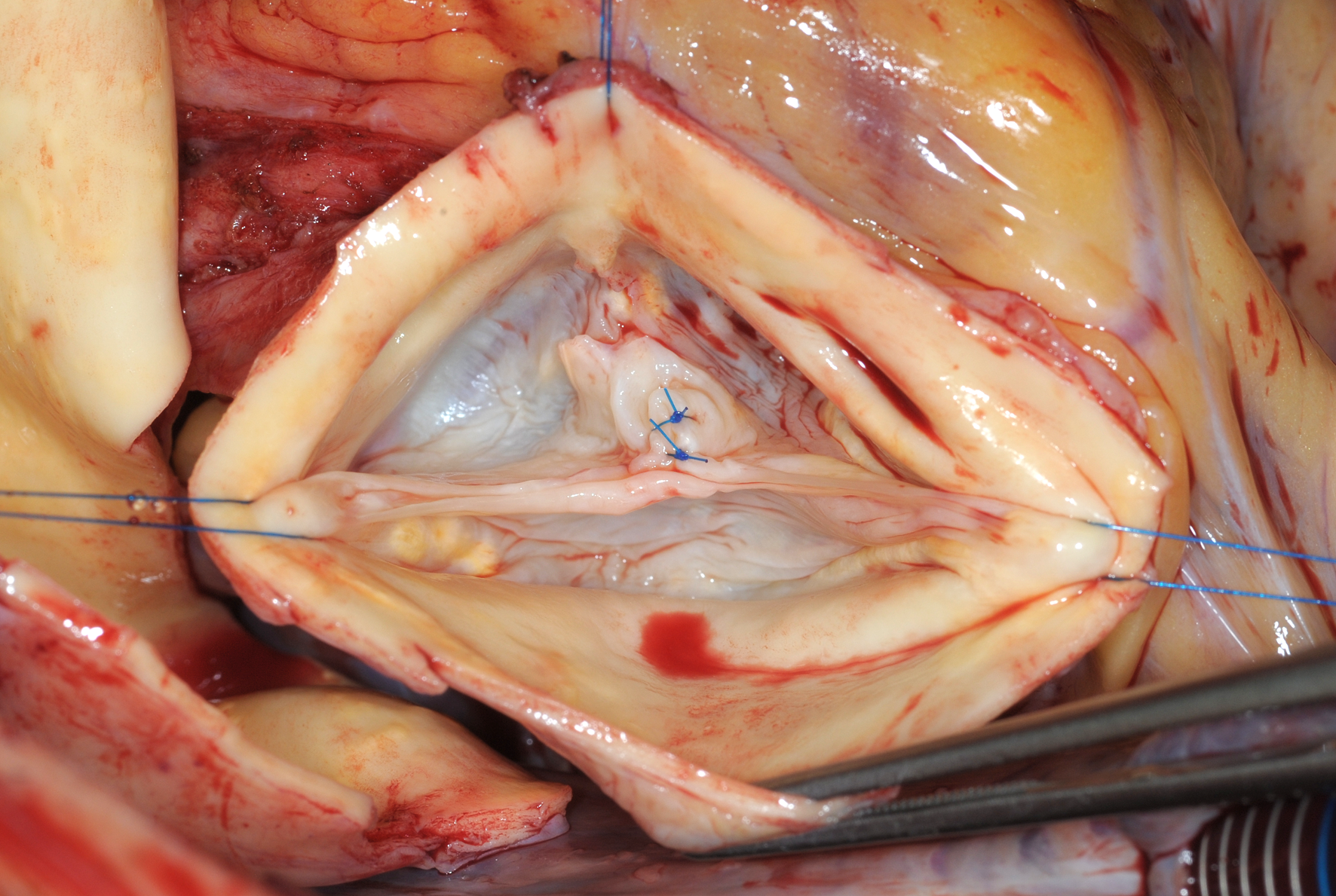
Repaired bicuspid aortic valve. The stretching of the fused cusp has been corrected by sutures, the correct coaptation of the cusps is easily visible.

Since the bicuspid anatomy commonly has an almost normal valve function (unless deformed) it is left bicuspid; the repair procedure simply corrects the secondary deformations that led to regurgitation. Similar to tricuspid aortic valves, the cusps must be measured to rule out shrinkage. The annulus is commonly enlarged, it must be reduced and stabilized by an annuloplasty. Tissue redundancy through stretching is corrected by sutures.

==== Unicuspid aortic valve ====
A unicuspid aortic valve may not only result in relevant stenosis (narrowing), it may also lead to significant regurgitation. In a proportion of the affected individuals, an aneurysm of the ascending aorta may be present which may need treatment as well. The repair procedure will change the configuration of the valve by creating at least one additional commissure. Commonly the unicuspid valve is changed into a bicuspid configuration; the resulting valve function will be close to normal. Cusp tissue is resected where it is grossly abnormal. Using patch tissue, the cusps are enlarged so they reach the second (new) commissure. If the annulus is enlarged it must be reduced and stabilized.

==== Quadricuspid aortic valve ====
Aortic regurgitation in a quadricuspid valve is commonly caused by the additional (4th) commissure, which holds back cusp tissue and keeps it from closing adequately. Currently, the most reliable concept for repair of a quadricuspid valve seems to be its conversion into a tricuspid valve. In some cases a bicuspid configuration may be appropriate. In order to achieve this cusp, tissue is detached from the aorta and the valve is then brought into adequate form.

=== Aneurysm of the ascending aorta ===
Enlargement of the ascending aorta may lead to aortic valve regurgitation because the outward tension on the cusps prevents their adequate closure. Regurgitation may also (in part) be due to congenital malformation of the aortic valve or concomitant stretching of a tricuspid aortic valve. Life expectancy may be limited by severe aortic regurgitation. An ascending aortic aneurysm may become so large that it ruptures or dissects (both life-threatening complications).

The operation must address the aneurysm by replacing the enlarged part of the aorta. Since the aortic valve is very sensitive in its form and function to any changes of the aortic dimensions, the operation will in most cases also have to address the valve, i.e. apply the principles of aortic valve repair. This principle applies to tricuspid valves as well as bicuspid or unicuspid aortic valves.

The goal of the operation is to eliminate the aneurysm and to preserve or repair the aortic valve. The operation may include valve-sparing aortic root replacement. Replacement of the root is usually not necessary if its diameter is less than 40 to 45 mm. In those instances replacement of the ascending aorta is sufficient. If root diameter exceeds 45 mm it will have to be replaced in many instances. There are two main operative techniques currently used, and both lead to similar results. With both techniques the aortic valve must be carefully assessed after replacement of the root; repair of any aortic valve abnormalities is necessary in order to achieve good and durable valve function.

Operative details

There are two options: tubular ascending aortic replacement or replacement of the aortic root.

Tubular ascending aortic replacement

The aorta is divided above the aortic valve and root. The avascular graft is then sutured to the aortic root. The form of the aortic valve may have been changed by this maneuver, so it has to be carefully rechecked. Often stretching of a cusp becomes apparent at that point, and this will have to corrected by sutures.

Replacement of the aortic root

After the heart has been arrested, the enlarged aorta is removed close to the insertion line of the aortic valve cusps. The origins of the coronary arteries must be detached from the aorta. A graft is tailored to create 3 tongues that replace the aneurysmatic aortic wall in the root. The graft is then sutured to the cusp insertion lines. Some surgeons combine this procedure with an annuloplasty. The aortic valve is mobilized even further from the surrounding tissues. The avascular graft is then positioned around the valve, and the valve is fixed inside the graft with sutures.

With both techniques, the form of the aortic valve must be carefully assessed after completed root replacement. In most instances some cusp stretching will be found which would result in prolapse and relevant regurgitation afterward if uncorrected. Thus an aortic valve repair procedure will frequently be necessary according to the principles of tricuspid or bicuspid aortic valve repair.

== Postoperative treatment ==
Unlike valve replacement with mechanical prostheses, inhibition of the blood clotting system (anticoagulation) is not necessary after aortic valve repair. Blood-thinning may only be necessary if atrial fibrillation occurs or persists, in order to prevent blood clot formation in the left atrium.

It is unclear whether routine prophylactic antibiotic administration is necessary after aortic valve repair.

== History ==
First attempts at aortic valve repair were undertaken even before heart valve prostheses were developed. In 1912 the French surgeon Theodore Tuffier widened a stenotic (narrowed) aortic valve. The colleagues of Dwight Harken reported in 1958 on their experience with aortic valve repair for aortic regurgitation by narrowing the annulus of the aortic valve. In those times, both surgeons and cardiologists had minimal information on the exact nature and severity of dysfunction of the aortic valve. This changed with the development of echocardiography by Inge Edler and Carl Hellmuth Hertz in the early 1950s. Nonetheless, the development of heart valve prostheses made replacement the standard approach because of its reproducibility. The first ball-cage valve was implanted in 1961 by the American surgeons Albert Starr and Lowell Edwards, and in the next decades many mechanical and biological prostheses were developed and used. The positive results with the repair of the mitral valve stimulated surgeons in the 1980s and 1990s to develop surgical techniques that could be applied for the different causes of aortic regurgitation. Stepwise improvements were introduced in the subsequent years; today many regurgitant aortic valves can be treated by repair.
