= Lawrence H. Cohn =

American surgeon and academic (1937–2016)

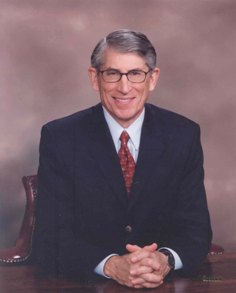
- Born: March 11, 1937; San Francisco, California, U.S.
- Died: January 9, 2016 (aged 78); Boston, Massachusetts, U.S.
- Education: Stanford University School of Medicine; University of California, Berkeley
- Known for: Heart valve repair and replacement surgery Minimally invasive heart valve surgery
- Medical career
- Profession: Surgeon
- Institutions: Brigham and Women's Hospital; Harvard Medical School
- Sub-specialties: Cardiovascular surgery

Lawrence H. Cohn, (March 11, 1937 – January 9, 2016) was an American pioneering cardiac surgeon, researcher, and medical educator. He had been on the surgical staff at Harvard Medical School since 1971 and had been a Professor of Surgery at Harvard Medical School since 1980. In 2000, he was awarded the first endowed Chair in Cardiac Surgery at Harvard Medical School.

== Early life and medical career ==
Born in San Francisco, California, Cohn received his Bachelor of Arts degree from the University of California, Berkeley with honors in 1958. In 1962, he received his Doctor of Medicine degree from the Stanford University School of Medicine with distinction (Alpha Omega Alpha). He received his graduate medical training from 1962 to 1971 at Boston City Hospital/Harvard, the National Heart Institute in Bethesda, Maryland, the University of California at San Francisco and the Stanford University School of Medicine. During his tenure at Stanford University, he trained with pioneering heart surgeon, Dr. Norman E. Shumway. At Harvard Medical School, he served as Assistant Professor of Surgery from 1971 to 1975, Associate Professor of Surgery from 1975 to 1980, Professor of Surgery since 1980, and was awarded the first endowed Virginia and James Hubbard Chair in Cardiac Surgery in 2000.

He was awarded an honorary Masters of Medicine from Harvard in 1989 and a Doctor Honoris Causa from the University of Paris in 1992. In 2005 he was the recipient of the Paul Dudley White Award, the highest award given by the American Heart Association. He has served as the Chief of Cardiac Surgery at Brigham and Women's Hospital from 1987 to 2005 and as Director of the Cardiothoracic Surgery Residency Training Program at Brigham and Women’s Hospital/Children's Hospital Medical Center from 1987 to 2000. From 2000 to 2004, he served as Chair of the Brigham and Women’s Physician Organization (BWPO). Currently, he serves as Physician Director of Medical Device Technology for Partners HealthCare Systems and is the Chair of the Physician and Scientist Fundraising Program (PSFP) at the Brigham and Women's Hospital.

== Medical pioneer, researcher, and educator ==
Having performed over 11,000 cardiac surgical operations, Cohn was an expert in the field of heart valve repair and replacement surgery and minimally invasive heart valve surgery. He published over 440 original scientific articles, 105 book chapters and 12 books, including Cardiac Surgery in the Adult, the most referenced text book in adult cardiac surgery today. He gave more than 750 lectures worldwide. He held office in the American Board of Thoracic Surgery (ABTS), the American College of Cardiology, and the American Association for Thoracic Surgery of which he was President. In 1999, he presented pioneering cardiac surgeon Dr. Michael E. DeBakey with the Scientific Achievement Award of The American Association for Thoracic Surgery. He also had been the President of the American College of Chest Physicians and Chairman of the Board of the National Library of Medicine in Bethesda, Maryland. He was Past-President of the Thoracic Surgery Foundation for Research and Education. He was a member of 20 other professional organizations, and held honorary membership in 4 international organizations. He served on the Editorial Board of 14 medical journals. He was the editor of the Journal of Thoracic and Cardiovascular Surgery, the most referenced journal in the field of cardiothoracic surgery.

He was a consultant in cardiovascular services with emphasis on the organization of the cardiovascular service line. As a part of this consultative effort, he had been very involved in advising medical centers strategies for medical device purchases emphasizing standardization and economization as well as efficacy of the products.

As an educator, Cohn trained more than 150 residents and fellows at the Brigham and Women's Hospital/Children's Hospital Medical Center Cardiothoracic Surgery Residency Training Program. Graduates of this program occupy responsible positions at medical centers worldwide, including approximately 30 surgeons who are Division Chiefs or Department Chairs.
