= Decellularized homograft =

Human heart valve modified for transplant

Decellularized homografts are donated human heart valves which have been modified via tissue engineering. Several techniques exist for decellularization with the majority based on detergent or enzymatic protocols which aim to eliminate all donor cells while preserving the mechanical properties of the remaining matrix.

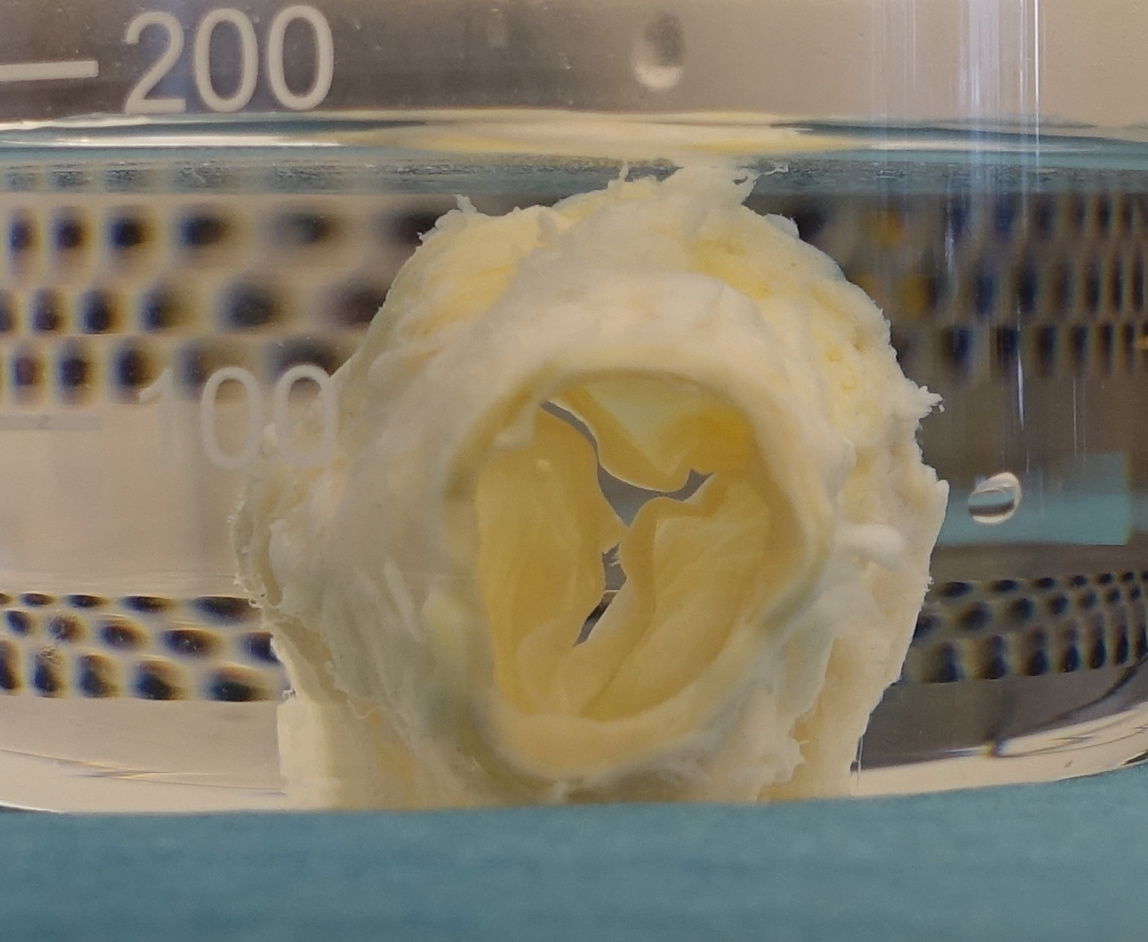
Top view of a fresh decellularized, non-seeded, aortic homograft with three pliable cusps.

== Background ==
Aortic valve disease affects the valve between the left ventricle and the aorta, and can be present as a congenital condition at birth or caused by other factors. Several therapeutic options are open to patients once the indication for aortic valve replacement has been confirmed. One option is replacement using a mechanical valve.

This, however, necessitates a strict lifelong anticoagulation regime to avoid cerebral thromboembolism. These blood thinners hold an inherent risk for severe bleeding episodes, which affects both professional and leisure activities and the majority of patients opt to not use mechanical valves for this reason.

Biological prostheses, i.e. pericardial heart valves of animal origin (xenogenic), offer a viable alternative. However, in particular for young patients, it has been found that xenogenic valves do not provide satisfactory durability and rapid valve degeneration can occur within months.

A further avenue open to patients is a so-called Ross operation, an extensive surgical procedure in which the diseased aortic valve is replaced by the patient's pulmonary valve (autograft). The pulmonary valve then needs to be replaced by a heart valve prosthesis. A drawback of this method is that it can frequently result in a "two-valve" diseased heart, as almost all autografts are impaired by progressive dilatation in the long term, and the pulmonary valve prosthesis, often a conventional cryopreserved homograft, is subject to the same rate of degeneration as all biological valves. This can thereby lead to frequent reoperations which have a substantially higher mortality rate due to postoperative adhesions.

== Tissue engineering concepts ==
The lack of durable heart valve prostheses for young patients has driven forward research in tissue engineering approaches for valve replacement. Current tissue-engineering concepts are based on either artificial polymeric or biological scaffolds, derived from donated human tissue (allogeneic) or animals (xenogenic). While more readily available, there have been reports of dramatic failure in the use of xenogeneic matrices in paediatric patients, leading to scepticism regarding their application.

Total artificial tissue-engineered heart valve concepts are currently under development and would solve many unmet clinical demands, such as the permanent availability of different sizes and lengths. These concepts have shown good results in the technical implementation of valved polymeric conduit production and have successfully been used for in vitro and in vivo seeding of different (stem) cell lines. However, preclinical testing in long-term animal models has yet to deliver satisfactory results due to a lack of mechanical, leading to early failure of the valvular function.

== Conventional homografts ==
Aortic valve replacement using a homograft in orthotopic position was first performed over 50 years ago on 24 July 1962 by Donald Ross at Guy's Hospital, London and has been assessed in prospective randomized studies, e.g. in comparison to the Ross procedure. Aortic valve replacement using conventional cryopreserved homografts is currently performed only in about 3% of all patients, mostly to treat acute aortic valve endocarditis.1 Severe calcification of conventional homografts frequently occurs and is the main reason for its restrictive use, however, current guidelines confirm homografts as a valid alternative for young patients requiring anatomical reconstruction of the outflow tract.

== Decellularized pulmonary homografts (DPH) ==
DPH have been clinically implanted since 2002 in paediatric patients. The indications mainly include patients with pulmonary diseases such as pulmonary valve stenosis, atresia or insufficiency. They have shown excellent early to midterm clinical performance, challenging conventional cryopreserved homografts as the "gold standard" for pulmonary valve replacement in congenital heart disease. Compared to cryopreserved homograft, decellularized pulmonary homografts have shown less degeneration and had to be explanted less. The main limitation is the low availability of such homografts and the higher costs.

== Decellularized aortic homografts (DAH) ==
DAH developed at Hannover Medical School (MHH) have shown sufficient mechanical stability for the systemic circulation at the greatest possible extent of antigen elimination and have been validated in long-term animal models. The first DAH was implanted in human in the year 2008.

A multicenter european study of aortic valve replacement with the use of DAH in 106 pediatric patients published in 2020 showed outcome data comparable to Ross procedure and mechanical aortic valve implantation and better results compared to cryopreserved homografts. In comparison to Ross procedure, early mortality rates were lower in DAH patients (2,2% versus 4,2%), however this trend was not statistically significant. Complications due to coronary reimplantation during DAH implantation occurred in 3.8% and progressive valve degeneration in 10%.

A multicenter european study in both pediatric and adult patients compared DAH with Ross procedure and showed almost identical results regarding valve degeneration and freedom from explantation.
