= Aneurysm of the aortic sinus =

Aneurysm of sinus of Valsalva
- Other names: Aortic sinus aneurysm
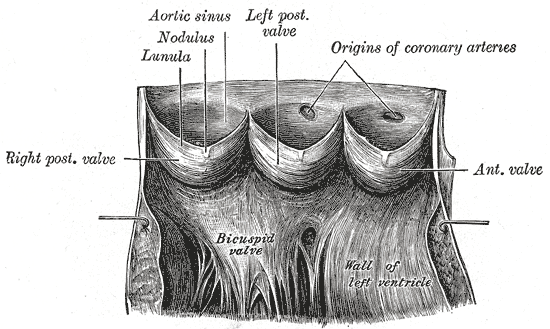
- Aorta laid open to show the semilunar valves. (Aortic sinus, also known as "sinus of Valsalva", is labeled at upper left.)
- Specialty: Cardiology
- Complications: Rupture, heart failure, stroke
- Diagnostic method: Echocardiogram, cardiac CT scan, cardiac MRI scan
- Treatment: Blood pressure control, surgery
- Medication: Beta-adrenoceptor antagonists
- Prognosis: Median survival after rupture 3.9 years
- Frequency: 0.09%

Aneurysm of the aortic sinus, also known as the sinus of Valsalva, is a rare abnormality of the aorta, the largest artery in the body. The aorta normally has three small pouches that sit directly above the aortic valve (the sinuses of Valsalva), and an aneurysm of one of these sinuses is a thin-walled swelling. Aneurysms may affect the right (65–85%), non-coronary (10–30%), or rarely the left (< 5%) coronary sinus. These aneurysms may not cause any symptoms but if large can cause shortness of breath, palpitations or blackouts. Aortic sinus aneurysms can burst or rupture into adjacent cardiac chambers, which can lead to heart failure if untreated.

Aortic sinus aneurysms may occur in isolation, or may be seen in association with other diseases of the aorta including Marfan syndrome, Loeys-Dietz syndrome, and bicuspid aortic valve. They can be diagnosed using an echocardiogram or cardiac magnetic resonance imaging (MRI) scan. Treatment includes blood pressure control but surgical repair may be needed, especially if the aneurysm ruptures.

== Symptoms and signs ==
If unruptured, sinus of Valsalva aneurysm (commonly abbreviated SVA or SOVA) is usually asymptomatic and typically goes undetected until symptoms appear or medical imaging is performed for other reasons. If symptoms do occur, the most common are shortness of breath, palpitations, myocardial ischemia, and syncope. Even less common, but more serious, presentations are embolic stroke and myocardial infarction due to blockage of a coronary artery by the aneurysm.

A ruptured aneurysm typically leads to an aortocardiac shunt and progressively worsening heart failure.

An aneurysm of the aortic sinus may rupture due to infective endocarditis involving the aortic wall and tertiary-stage syphilis.

The manifestations appear depending on the site where the sinus has ruptured. For example, if the sinus ruptures in a low pressure area like the right atrium or right ventricle then a continuous type of murmur is heard. The murmur is located in the left parasternal region mainly confined to the lower sternum. It is also accompanied by a superficial thrill. A ruptured Sinus of Valsalva abscess represents a surgical emergency.

== Causes ==
This type of aneurysm is typically congenital and may be associated with heart defects. It is sometimes associated with Marfan syndrome or Loeys–Dietz syndrome, but may also result from Ehlers–Danlos syndrome, bicuspid aortic valve, atherosclerosis, hypoplastic left heart syndrome, syphilis, cystic medial necrosis, chest injury, or infective endocarditis.

== Diagnosis ==
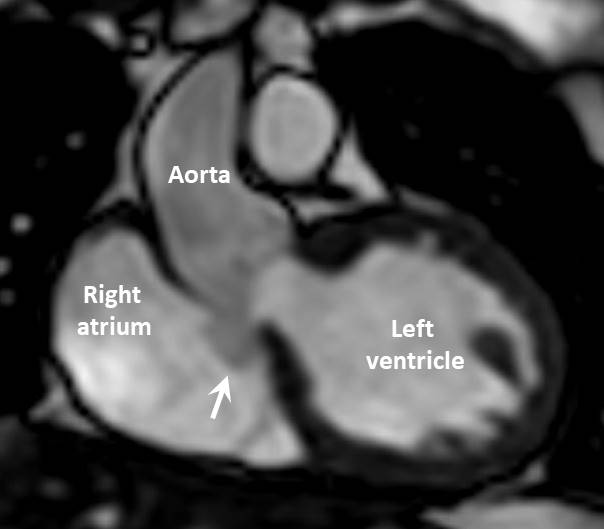
Cardiac MRI scan showing intact sinus of Valsalva aneurysm (arrowed) extending from non-coronary cusp to right atrium.

The first step in diagnosis is typically transthoracic echocardiography. However, if surgery is planned or if the standard echocardiogram lacks sufficient detail, then one or more additional studies are recommended. These studies include transesophageal echocardiography, 3D echocardiography, CT Angiography and aortic angiography. Cardiac MRI may be another option.

== Treatment ==
Medical therapy of aneurysm of the aortic sinus includes blood pressure control through the use of drugs, such as beta blockers.

Another approach is surgical repair. The determination to perform surgery is usually based upon the diameter of the aortic root (with 5 centimeters being a rule of thumb - a normal size is 2-3 centimeters) and the rate of increase in its size (as determined through repeated echocardiography).

An alternative to surgical repair or a ruptured aneurysm is percutaneous closure. In this technique, a wire is introduced via a small incision in the groin and advanced through the vascular system to the aneurysm. A closure device is advanced along the wire before being expanded to straddle the site of rupture.

== Prognosis ==
If a sinus of Valsalva aneurysm ruptures, the life expectancy without treatment is approximately four years. Surgery carries a 1% risk of intra-operative death with higher risks associated with infected aneurysms, and 5- to 10-year survival rates following surgery range from 82 to 97%. Percutaneous closure has been reported to succeed in approximately 96.7% of cases of ruptured sinus of Valsalva aneurysm and is associated with good functional status in most patients for nearly seven years after treatment.

== Epidemiology ==
Aneurysms of the sinuses of Valsalva are estimated to affect 0.09% of the population. Rupture of a sinus of Valsalva can occur at any age. Rupture is five times more likely to occur in those of far eastern than western ethnic backgrounds, and is twice as likely to occur in males than females.

== History ==
The first description of sinus of Valsalva aneurysm was made in 1939.

== See also ==
- Aortic aneurysm
- Thoracic aortic aneurysm
- Abdominal aortic aneurysm
