= Cardarelli =

Cardarelli is an Italian surname. Notable people with the surname include:

- Amos Cardarelli (1930–2018), Italian footballer
- Antonio Cardarelli (1831–1927), Italian physician
  - Cardarelli's sign
- Joe Cardarelli (1944–1994), American poet
- Vincenzo Cardarelli (1887–1959), Italian journalist, writer and poet
