= Pericardial heart valves =

The pericardial heart valve was invented by Marian Ionescu, a British surgeon working at the General Infirmary in Leeds, England. He created this artificial bioprosthetic heart valve as a three-cusp structure made of chemically treated bovine pericardium attached to a Dacron cloth-covered titanium frame.

== The Realisation of a concept ==
The experimental and in vitro testing of this novel device took place in 1970, and in March 1971, Ionescu began, for the first time, the implantation of the pericardial valve in all three cardiac positions in humans. Between 1971 and 1976 the valves had been made in Ionescu's own hospital laboratory. Throughout these five years of usage in 212 patients the performance of the pericardial valve was thoroughly evaluated. The results showed that this original valve exhibited the best haemodynamic performance, at rest and during exercise, when compared with the reported results of all other artificial valves in existence. It demonstrated a very low risk of embolisation even in the absence of long term anticoagulation treatment of the patients. There were no cases of valve thrombosis, intra-vascular haemolysis or sudden, unexpected valve failure. The durability of the valve was good at 5 years of follow-up.

Based on these results, the Shiley Laboratory in Irvine, California, began to manufacture this valve and to distribute it worldwide under the name of the 'Ionescu - Shiley Pericardial Xenograft.'

From 1976 onwards a series of modifications were made in order to improve the qualities and the performance of the pericardial xenograft. The selection and preparation of the bovine pericardium were standardised and rigorously controlled. For tissue fixation at zero pressure a solution of 0.5% purified glutaraldehyde was used. It contained an optimal proportion of monomers and polymers and an ideal cross-link density was obtained by controlling the concentration and the pH of the solution as well as its temperature and exposure time of the tissue to its action. The thickness and pliability of the pericardium were standardized and the direction of macroscopically visible fibres matched for each three cusps of a particular valve. The supporting stent was changed. The titanium was replaced with machined Delrin which is an acetyl homopolymer with low 'creep' properties due to a stable molecular memory. It is flexible and shock absorbent, essential qualities for a tissue heart valve support. This new stent contained a radio-opaque marker at its base for easy identification. The contour of the scalloped posts was modified and the height of the stent reduced. The entire Delrin structure was covered with seamless Dacron velour and at a later stage, the margins of the scalloped edges were covered with a thin layer of pericardium in an attempt to prevent or reduce the abrasion of the leaflets when in contact with this margin during valve closure. The sewing rim was bolstered for better and safer attachment to the heart annuli and its shape was anatomically contoured into two different configurations to better fit in the aortic and the atrio-ventricular positions. Two other additions were made: an integral valve holder which prevents the touching of the valve's cusps, and a 'freeze-watch' indicator as a safe—guard against exposing the valves during transportation or storage at temperatures below 4 degrees Celsius.

The geometry of the valve was slightly modified due to changes in the shape of the stent and by removing the outside pledgets around the posts. This gave a more streamlined shape of the whole structure. These modifications had been progressively introduced and all of them were incorporated in the 'Ionescu - Shiley Low Profile Pericardial Xenograft' valve, which became available in 1983.

Approximately 200,000 pericardial valves manufactured by Shiley Laboratories were distributed around the world between 1976 and 1987 and it is presumed that most of them were implanted in patients. The use of this valve generated a lot of interest expressed in several specialist symposia, academic meetings, and numerous scientific articles published over the years.

The appropriation and organisation of this enormous material and the classification and interpretation of data has been a very difficult and complex task, especially because - contrary to what it is claimed - there remains a great deal of variation in standards of reporting in all essential chapters of a scientific work. In some cases it is quite impossible to follow such standards as it will be described later. Despite all these difficulties and impediments, a general view of the performance of the pericardial valve as close to reality as possible could be obtained.

One should however keep in mind that any single investigator should resist the temptation to write a review of such a complex matter as tissue heart valves, and to cover the subject completely and fairly. One should also remember that if we study complex and variable conditions, averages must be rejected because they confuse while aiming to unify, and distort while aiming to simplify.

From the material available it is evident that the reported hospital mortality and, up to a certain point, late mortality are similar among the various publications of different authors, and do not directly reflect on the quality of the valve used.

== Haemodynamic Investigations and In-Vitro Testing of Valves ==
The Ionescu pericardial valve had a large central opening almost equal with the inner surface area of the supporting stent. This, plus the pliability of the pericardial tissue, confer this valve exceptional hydraulic qualities. Haemodynamic studies by several authors investigating patients with pericardial valves demonstrated that in all respects the haemodynamic function of this valve is superior to that reported for the porcine valves and, generally speaking, equal to that of the best mechanical prostheses. The haemodynamic results reported by other investigators are very similar to those by Tandon's group. Some authors stressed the advantage of very low pressure gradients across small pericardial valves (viz: 17, 19 and 21mm diameter) for implantation in small aortic roots without the need of complex surgical techniques for root enlargement.

Tandon and associates performed pre- and postoperative haemodynamic investigations at rest and during exercise in 110 patients. There were 51 with aortic valve replacement, 44 with mitral replacement, 3 with tricuspid and 12 who received multiple valve replacement. Following a technique and protocol developed at Leeds General Infirmary, from the group of 110 patients investigated, 13 patients with aortic and 6 with mitral valve replacement were subjected to multiple, sequential haemodynamic studies at rest and during exercise at the following intervals: aortic: preoperatively and at 9.9, 42.2 and 68.3 months postoperatively; mitral: preoperatively and at 11.2, 42.3 and 68.7 months postoperatively. The results obtained showed that the considerable improvement recorded at the first postoperative investigation was maintained up to 68 months following valve replacement.

In order to demonstrate visually the reasons for the great haemodynamic difference between the pericardial and porcine valves, Ionescu recorded in a 'pulse duplicator' the opening characteristics of two porcine valves (Hancock Modified Orifice and the recently modified Edwards valve) and two pericardial valves (the Standard and the Low-Profile Shiley valves).

All four valves were manufactured for clinical use and all had an implantation diameter of 25mm. The valves were tested under identical conditions in the mitral compartment of the pulse duplicator and photographs were taken at the peak of diastole. The flow rates were for each frame, from left to right: 0, 100, 200, 300 and 400 ml per second. The opening of the cusps of both types of pericardial valves is synchronous and regular, without three-dimensional flexure and the low-profile pericardial valve shows an even larger opening when compared with the standard pericardial valve. There are no crevices or dead spaces behind the open cusps of the pericardial valves. The difference between the porcine and the pericardial valves is flagrant in all respects. (Fig )

Many authors had studied, in-vitro, the hydrodynamic performance of the pericardial valve and found that it possesses better functional characteristics than the porcine valves and similar to those of the best prostheses. In summary, the excellent haemodynamic function of the pericardial valve is one of its great advantages and sets it aside from all other tissue valves.

== Valve-related complications ==
=== Thrombosis, embolism and anticoagulation-related haemorrhage ===
While dealing with a very large number of reports from different hospitals with various numbers of patients who received pericardial valves and were followed up for differing durations of time, from five to ten years, and especially because the reporting did not follow an 'established' albeit loose 'standard' of identification, description and grading of the events, it is better to enumerate the results from some of the more representative series reported and draw only general conclusions.

The following data show the results as given in actuarial percentages of freedom from embolism.

TABLE I. Freedom from embolism

Main author	No. of patients	Duration follow-up	Actuarial freedom from embolisation
DA Cooley	2701	5 years	93.2% for all patients, 96.1% for aortic, 89.9% for mitral and 94% for mitral and aortic replacement
A Pavie	675	5 years	93.8% for all patients
M Holden	290	6 years	5 emboli (1 certain, 4 doubtful) 0.70% per patient year
J M Reveulta	90	8 years	93.6% for all patients
L Gonzalez-Lavin	224	8 years	95.3% for aortic, 97.4% for mitral replacement
JB Garcia-Bengochea	248	8 years	97.5% for all patients
N P Silverton	492	6–10 years	96.8% for mitral, 97.2% for multiple replacements
X D Zhu	520	9 Years	95.8% for all patients
M I Ionescu	1171	10 years	96.4% for aortic, 96.8% for mitral, 97.2% for multiple replacements

From perusing innumerable publications on the results of heart valve replacement with pericardial valves concerning the rate of embolic complications, one may formulate several conclusions.

A clear picture concerning the exactitude of thrombotic and embolic complications of artificial heart valves, and especially of pericardial valves, seems to be very difficult. The knowledge at present is superficial and incomplete concerning the real causes and the risk and contributing factors to this complex phenomenon. Consequently, it has never been practical to try to standardise definitions, and even more complicated to establish lines of treatment. Everyone talks of 'causes' and 'risk factors' but no-one possesses any scientific evidence to this effect.

The so-called 'risk factors' for embolisation, with the exception of atrial fibrillation, can be called, at best, 'scientific illusions'. Consequently, any scientific, logical way of establishing a therapeutic means for preventing such phenomena due to unknown or incompletely understood causes is doomed to remain empirical, and the end results uncertain. There are myriads of reports for and against anticoagulant treatment for patients with tissue heart valve replacement. In addition, heart valve replacement patients are followed-up by a 'committee' made up successively by the surgeon, the cardiologist, the general practitioner in this or another town, etc. The impression of knowledge or our acceptance of ignorance compound this matter further. The only solution, for patients and doctors alike, would be an artificial heart valve which carries a very low risk of clotting, and therefore would not require, in the majority of cases, anticoagulant treatment.

One main drawback in the recent 'scientific' literature on pericardial valves is that the essential data for arriving at an intelligent interpretation of results is missing. There is no description of the pre-operative condition of the patients concerning cardiac rhythm, various arrhythmias, atrial fibrillation, anticoagulant treatment, previous systemic emboli, etc., and scant information about the post-operative condition: cardiac rhythm, the nature and duration of anticoagulation, the time of occurrence of embolic phenomena and the magnitude and sequelae, if any.

All this is already in the past, now, for practical purposes, one can conclude that the pericardial valve carries a very small risk of embolisation, much smaller than that of the porcine valves even in the absence of anticoagulant treatment. The risk of pericardial valve thrombosis is exceedingly remote. The very few cases reported have not been thoroughly investigated as far as the cause or the contributing factors, related or not to the valve, are concerned. Anticoagulant related haemorrhage was extremely rarely reported because few patients received prothrombin depressants for long periods of time (Sublata Causa Tollitur Effectus).

There are several reports on tissue valves stating that the incidence of emboli was higher among patients receiving anticoagulation. In addition, it was observed that the rate of embolisation appears to be decreasing with the passage of time with the pericardial valves, unlike the experience with porcine valves in the mitral position where the risk remained constant during the whole period of follow-up in spite of different schemes of long-term anticoagulation.

The favourable embolic rate and virtual lack of valve thrombosis of the pericardial valve appears to be due to the quality of the tissue, and especially to the design of the valve with a smooth and synchronous movement of the three cusps and the streamlined structure conferring the valve optimal hydrodynamic characteristics even at low flow rates.

=== Infective endocarditis ===
Infective endocarditis is a severe condition which occurs on native as well as on artificial valves. Both mechanical prosthetic devices and tissue heart valves are affected. The incidence of endocarditis, in western countries, ranges from 1.5 to 6.2 cases per 100,000 people per annum. The cumulative rate of prosthetic valve endocarditis is 1.5 to 3.0% at one year following valve replacement and 3 to 6% at five years, the risk being the greatest during the first six months after valve replacement.

Prosthetic valve endocarditis arising within two months of valve surgery is generally the result of intra-operative contamination of the prosthesis or a bacteraemic post-operative complication. The nosocomial nature of these infections is reflected in their primary microbial causes: coagulase-negative staphylococci, S. aureus, facultative gram negative bacilli, diphtheroids and fungi.

Epidemiologic evidence suggests that prosthetic valve endocarditis due to coagulase negative staphylococci that presents between 2 and 12 months after surgery is often nosocomial in origin but with a delayed onset.

This short introduction may help to reflect on the various and sometimes opposing view-points concerning the 'origin' of prosthetic valve endocarditis. As in most recent scientific reports, some descriptions of tissue valve endocarditis suffer from the same lack of clarity and standardization in the presentation of facts and do not give all relevant details for a better understanding of events and their causes. From eight published articles of large series of patients with Ionescu-Shiley Pericardial valves, only one report presents a higher than average number of valvular bacterial infections. The other seven publications describe the rate of infection with figures of similar magnitude.

TABLE II. Freedom from infective endocarditis

Main author	No. of patients	Duration of follow-up years	Linearized rate of infection	Actuarial freedom from infective endocarditis
Pavie	675	5		98.2% for all patients, 97.8% for aortic, 99% for mitral, 100% for multiple valve replacements
Duncan (A)	2720	6		97.3% for all patients, 97.4% for aortic valves, 97.6% for mitral valves, 96.3% for multiple valve replacement
Ionescu (B)	1171	10		93.7% for all patients, 94.7% for aortic valves, 97.1% for mitral valves, 89.3% for multiple valve replacement
Zhu	520	10		98% for all patients
Revuelta	239	8	0.67% per patient year	
Garcia-Bengochea	248	8	0.78% per patient year	
Holden (C)	290	6	1.1% per patient year	
Bachet (D)	224	6	1.6% per patient year	

Footnotes to the table:

(A): The authors make a remark: Prior to heart valve replacement 86 patients suffered from infective endocarditis but only 9 of these patients developed recurrent infection following pericardial valve replacement.

(B): Of the 17 cases of infection, 15 occurred between 1976 and 1981 and only 2 cases between 1981 and 1985. Ionescu's group took draconian measures in trying to jugulate post-operative infections which they considered to be, in great part, nosocomial in origin. Those measures were directed at systematic pre-operative dental examination and treatment, search for any hidden, potential foci of infection - urological, upper and lower respiratory tract, judicious selection of antibiotic cover of the patient before, during and following heart valve replacement operations and strict monitoring of all signs of infection in the post-operative period. It appears that these measures had borne fruit.

(C): On two occasions, Holden successfully implanted pericardial valves in patients with infective endocarditis and he advocates the use of such valves in similar situations because the pericardial valves are considered to be more resistant to infection than other devices.

(D): This group considers that in its hands the pericardial valves were more prone to infection than the porcine valves, and also when compared to the results with pericardial valves published by other surgeons.

In conclusion, it is obvious that the risk of infective endocarditis in pericardial valves is not dissimilar from that encountered in porcine valves at least up to ten years after valve insertion. It can also be considered that the minor variations occurring in the published reports are due to local hospital differences, surgical technique, general handling of the valves and other factors.

One rarely finds a patient who was treated medically for proven endocarditis on his own valve who does not require valve replacement sooner or later. There is no fundamental reason why any pericardial valve should become infected more frequently than another one except if the patient becomes septicaemic and the infecting organisms will reach the valve area. It appears illogical to claim that because one surgeon reported a higher incidence of infective endocarditis with one type of valve, that there could be any significant differences between 'his' valves and those implanted by other surgeons. The difference is in the number of patients with circulating infecting micro-organisms capable of infecting the valve area.

Most authors do not consider infective endocarditis as a valve-related failure and do not include cases of infection in such statistics. The pericardial valve does not behave in a different way from other tissue valves as far as infection is concerned, with probably one exception. In the impression of some surgeons, the pericardium itself seems to be more resistant to infection than the porcine valve.

=== Primary tissue failure ===
The durability of the pericardial valve, like that of all other artificial heart valves, depends on multiple factors, one of the most important being the environment in which the artificial valves function.

Primary or intrinsic tissue failure occurred with pericardial valves and it has been reported in several publications. Unfortunately, many reports do not contain some of the essential data and details necessary for building a clear image of this crucial aspect of valve performance. Table III tabulates some of the available data on primary tissue failure.

TABLE III. Primary tissue failure

Main author	No. of patients	Follow-up years	No. of valve failures	Free from failure. Actuarial
Pavie (A)	675	5	2 Aortic. Calcified and fibrosed	99.1% All patients
Revuelta	90 Aortic	8	2 valves calcified (0.71% per patient year)	89.9%
Gonzales-Lavin	240 Aortic	8	12 Valves, 11 calcified	88.4% Aortics only
Garcia-Bengochea	248	8	2 Valves (0.22% per patient year)	
Duncan (B)	2720	6	77 Valves. 52 Calcified, 25 Tears	91.5% Mitral, 86.2% Mitral and Aortic, 84.5% Aortic
Bachet	224	6	5 Valves. 4 Tears, 1 Calcified (0.80% per patient year)	
van Swieten	444	6	2 Valves, Tears (0.20% per patient year)	
Zhu (C)	520	9	5 Valves	92.1% Mitral, 89.9% Aortic
Ionescu	1171	9-10	25 Valves. 15 Tears, 9 Calcified, 1 Fibrosed. (Mitral 0.72%, Aortic 0.94% per patient year)	88.7% Mitral, 86.9% Aortic
Keon	637	8	19 Valves. 15 Tears, 4 Calcified	89% Mitral, 87% Aortic
Kawazoe	319	7	4 Valves. 3 Mitral, 1 Mitral and Aortic (all cusp tears)	93.4% Mitral, 90.5% Aortic
Nistal (D)	133 Aortic	7	8 Valves. All calcified, 2 with additional tears	80% All valves
Moran	400	5	9 Valves (8 Mitral, 1 aortic) 4 calcified - mean age 37.5, 5 tears - mean age 50.2. (0.87% per patient year)	

Remarks for primary tissue failure

(A): The ages of the patients range from 8 to 90 years (mean 57). 74% were over 70 years of age. The age of the two patients with valve failure (calcification) was not mentioned.

(B): The most important element in this large series is the demonstration that one of the most important factors in valve calcification is the age of the patient at the time of valve implantation.

(C): In this series, the authors mention, in addition, 4 cases of entanglement of sutures around the struts. These 4 patients were re-operated upon at between one week and 50 months following the first valve operation.

(D): The authors stated that all 8 failures were due to valve calcification and that 2 of them had additional tears. They find that their results with 'calcification' in all failed valves are contrary to Gabbay's results where failures occurred mainly through cusp tears.

This table is only an attempt to give a general impression and to provide a basis for a more detailed interpretation of results. However, several conclusions can be formulated on the complex, varied, and in some cases controversial results published. As very often, a good amount of significant data is missing and this complicates the task of being precise and fair in interpreting the results.

It appears that the great majority of pericardial valves function correctly until about 6 to 7 years post implantation. Beyond seven years of follow-up, the actuarial figures for freedom from valve failure start to decrease. In the table, the risk of valve failure seems to be greater in the aortic position as reported by some authors. In reality, the general consensus among surgeons, in various presentations and formal discussions, shows the contrary.

At 10 years, and beyond, the pericardial valve did function well in the aortic position, as reported by various authors., Several pericardial valves were explanted from the aortic position at 16, 17 and 18 years following implantation, and a few valves between 21 and 23 years. Pericardial valves in the mitral position fared less well beyond 5 – 6 years, as reported in some series, but not in others. Ravichandran reported a series of 34 patients (with 41 valves) who were re-operated upon for removal of failed Ionescu-Shiley pericardial valves. The failures occurred at a mean duration since 'implantation' of 11.3 years (mean range 3–17 years). There were 30 mitral and 11 aortic valves involved, and the majority were moderately or heavily calcified. Watanabe describes a case of an Ionescu-Shiley bioprosthesis which functioned 24years in the mitral position of a patient.

The known modes of tissue valve failure are: tearing of the pericardium, calcification of the valve and, exceptionally, fibrosis of the cusps. Tears represent approximately 25% and calcification 75% of primary failure. In some cases both pathologies could be encountered in the same valve. This proportion varies considerably and could be seen reversed in some series of patients.

The causes for pericardial tears were described in detail and can be summarised as an abrasive mechanism produced by the rubbing of the pericardium over the Dacron-covered margin of the supporting stent. Such tears progress slowly until a part of one of the cusps becomes flail and the amount of regurgitation increases. This explains the fact that there is no sudden catastrophic failure with the pericardial valve, except when the initial, obvious clinical signs and symptoms of incipient malfunction have been missed or disregarded by the treating physician or the patient. There may be, in a minority of cases, some slightly different mechanisms of pericardial damage at points of three-dimensional flexure or perforation caused by the excessively long ends of sutures used in aortic valve replacement.

Several techniques have been used in order to reduce or abolish 'abrasion', as will be described later. Within the limitation of the intrinsic durability of the chemically treated bovine pericardium, various modifications, physical and chemical, could be employed to eliminate this type of failure and considerably extend the functioning life of this valve.

Valve calcification is a local representation of a general biologic phenomenon which occurs under specific conditions in various parts of the body, especially in younger individuals. Valve calcification is known to have taken place in all types of tissue valves. Because some important details are not given in the reported series (age of patients, timing of occurrence, position of the valve, etc.) it is difficult to form a clear-cut conclusion in all situations.

One report on a large series of patients followed for six years, presented at a symposium in 1985, gave clear and complete information regarding the relationship between valve calcification and the age of the patients at the time of valve implantation. The authors showed that in the groups of patients aged between 10 and 59 years, the incidence of valve calcification ranged from 31.8% (in the age group of 10 to 20 years) to 1.8% (in the group aged 50 to 59 years) to reach zero calcification in patients older than 70 years. Similar conclusions about the relationship between age and valve related complications were published about porcine valves. The clear demonstration of this inverse relationship between the age of the patient and the rate of valve calcification 'sounded an alarm bell' and started to change the way in which tissue valves (porcine aortic and bovine pericardium) should be used in the future, and indicated the direction in which potential future research should be concentrated in order to make tissue valves universally acceptable by young and old patients without problems. At this moment in time,(2011), tissue valves are almost exclusively used in patients older than 65 years because in old age the process of calcification is considerably slowed down and also because the life of the valves may outlast the life of those patients who reach a 'respectable' age.

Several attempts have been made in order to abolish or at least to delay the occurrence of calcification. Two chemical processes were put forward: the T6 by Hancock Laboratory and the PV2 by Edwards Laboratory. The two chemical interventions had been tested in animals and in humans with unconvincing results. Subcutaneous implants, in rats, of cusps of porcine valves and strips of pericardium showed some positive results. However, care should be exercised in extrapolating such data obtained from subcutaneous implants to intracardiac location and function of valves in humans.

Jones and associates using the well known sheep model, which is a rapidly, universally and highly calcifying model, implanted porcine and pericardial valves either 'standard' or pre-treated with the Hancock T6 or the Edwards PV2 processes. The results showed that these processes mitigated the calcification of porcine valves but did not have any effect on the pericardial valves. Gallo conducted similar experiments using the same model as Jones and Ferrans and implanted Hancock porcine valves, with and without the T6 treatment, in the mitral and tricuspid positions of sheep. He found no significant difference in the amount of cusp calcification between the standard and the T6 treated valves, whether in the mitral or in the tricuspid position.

Although very little is known about the exact causes of this extremely complex process of calcification, attempts are made to treat it.

Macro and microscopic pathology studies of failed porcine bioprostheses by Schoen and Cohn showed in detail the process of tissue degeneration in valves with tears, calcification, or both. They consider that patients with porcine aortic bioprosthetic valves follow a clinically satisfactory course for around five years after operation. Late deterioration of these valves frequently necessitates re-operation. They estimate the rate of failure at approximately 15 to 25%, 7 to 10 years after valve implantation. Gallo and his associates describe in detail the rate of occurrence and timing of primary tissue failure with the Hancock porcine valve, and show a similar percentage of failures. The actuarial freedom from valve failure in the mitral position at 10 years is 69%, and in the aortic position only 53%. The rate of tissue valve failure accelerated from the third post-operative year in the mitral position, and from the fifth year in the aortic position with a precipitous fall during the 8th and 9th years of follow-up. They believe that the patient can be told that he or she has a 30% chance of requiring re-operation because of the porcine valve degeneration within the next 10 years. This general calculation does not take into account the other causes of valve 'problems' which may lead to re-operation or some other morbidity during that period of time. Goffin showed in a comparative histological study of explanted porcine and pericardial valves that the microscopic pathologic changes were similar in these two types of tissue. Grabenwoger found similar pathologic changes in the failed Sorin Pericarbon pericardial valve.

These long-term studies showed that both the tissue of pig valves and that of calf pericardium behave in a similar manner when used for valve replacement in humans. In a simplified way, the main difference between these two types of valves is the haemodynamic superiority of the pericardial valve and its smaller risk for embolisation. But the overwhelming advantage of the pericardial valve remains the fact that, being a man-made device, it lends itself to a variety of changes in order to improve its performance.

In most published reports about tissue heart valve replacement, there are differences in the presentation of data and of the results in all aspects of a particular topic between the various publications. In almost all chapters of valve function, with the exception of haemodynamic and hydraulic measurements - which are scientifically obtained and mathematically expressed - there are differences from author to author. Why in the hands of one surgeon, the same type of tissue valve fails in one patient at 24 months, and in another one it lasts 243 months? Microscopic studies performed on porcine and pericardial valves, explanted because of failure between 12 months and 6 years, all showed gross histological changes in the structure of tissue. In view of these changes in those valves, how did some of the porcine and pericardial valves continue to function well beyond 10 years? Why did the rate of occurrence of bacterial endocarditis differ from one hospital to another, and the embolic rate vary from surgeon to surgeon?

An overview of the publications on this topic may lead to the formulation of some tentative answers. There are, generally speaking, several potential factors which may affect variously the durability of tissue valves, and which may explain the discrepancy among published results. Carlos Duran summarised some of them in the following way:

- Variations at manufacturing level: Selection of tissue according to age of animal, thickness of the material in relation to the size of the valve to be constructed. The handling of the tissue from harvesting to the finished product. The design, chemical treatment and technique of construction of the device.
- About the patient: Complete information about the age and biological condition of the patient, history of other pathologies, heart rhythm, previous embolic episodes, anticoagulant treatment, etc.
- Concerning the surgeon: Correct rinsing of the bioprosthesis prior to implantation, maintaining the moistness of the valve throughout the time of implantation, careful handling of the device, extra care for the sterility and against possible contamination, correct positioning of the valve within the heart, especially in the mitral position, to avoid 'asymmetrical opening of the cusps'. The avoidance of trying to implant the largest possible valve in the respective heart annulus. All pericardial valves are large enough for the corresponding orifice in which they are supposed to be fitted comfortably.

Great damage can be inflicted on a bioprosthesis at the time of its implantation. One of the not so rare causes is allowing the cusps of the valve to become dry – to look like parchment - during the time of placement of sutures. Some errors occurred exceptionally: The plastic identification tag remained attached to the valve and became stuck to the left ventricle wall; the sutures meant to secure the introducer were not removed and all three cusps of a valve were limited in their movement; entangling sutures around the stent struts, sometimes around two struts: (one of the incidents was published under the title of 'Fatal bioprosthetic regurgitation immediately after mitral and tricuspid valve replacement with Ionescu-Shiley bioprosthesis').

During 1986, Shiley made a substantial and original modification to the pericardial valve. The stent was redesigned. It was made of two wafer-thin, unequal, flexible Delrin components: an outside, standard-shaped frame and an inner, smaller structure. The pericardial cusps were mounted inside the outer frame and were kept in position by the inner frame which is smaller and much thinner than the outer one. Through this arrangement, the lower parts of the pericardial cusps exit from the supporting frame at its bottom, and therefore the pericardium does not bend over the upper margin of the stent, eliminating the possibility of abrasion during the closure phase of the valve. As it was learned from clinical and from in-vitro studies, abrasion of the pericardium was a cause of valve failure when the tissue was attached on the outside of the stent. The in-vitro testing of this modified pericardial valve showed almost identical hydrodynamic results when compared with the existing pericardial valve. Accelerated life-testing showed that failure of this new valve occurred some 3 to 4 times later than that of existing valves. When valve failure occurred, it was not due to abrasion but through progressive fraying of the pericardium. Encouraged by these results, Shiley decided to start manufacturing this modified, improved valve called the 'Ionescu-Shiley Pericardial Optimograft'.

At about that time, grave problems were encountered by Shiley with the increasing number of sudden failure of the Bjork-Shiley mechanical disc valve. Pfizer laboratories, the drug manufacturer and owner of Shiley, stopped all manufacturing activities of Shiley Laboratory, with a view to liquidate the company. Consequently, not only was the Bjork-Shiley valve (the culprit) affected by this action, but all other products – valves, oxygenators, catheters, etc. - went out of production.

It was said (by Mr Larry Wettlaufer: Vice-President at Shiley Inc. 1987) that Ionescu did not want to go to another valve manufacturer with his 'Optimograft' and that he preferred his Himalayan climbing expeditions instead.

A careful appraisal of the results and the evolution of the two types of tissue valves created and used during the past four decades brings into focus the similarities but mainly the discrepancies which set them apart as structures and as functioning valves. The porcine valve was subjected to several modifications which reached the limits imposed by the fixed geometry of the pig's aortic valve.

The pericardial valve, the embodiment of the concept of 'man-made' devices, lends itself to an infinite permutation of changes of shape and physico-chemical interventions in order to improve its function, and indeed this is what happened. Almost 10 years after the creation, by Ionescu, of the pericardial valve, the concept behind it attracted several specialised laboratories to study this valve, to modify and improve it and bring it anew in the clinical field of usage, under different shapes and names, but always following the same general concept: glutaraldehyde-treated bovine pericardium mounted on a flexible frame as a three-cusp valve.

== The Second Generation of Pericardial Valves ==
Building the second generation of pericardial valves was possible, first of all, because there existed a first generation. The originality of the concept, the successes and failures, the flaws and positive aspects of the original pericardial valve and the experience accumulated with its use over the first 10 to 15 years created the incentive and showed the way for changes, modifications and potential improvements in building the valves of a second generation.

Of the several pericardial valves built since 1980, some have been abandoned early and only three have stood the test of time. These three modified and improved pericardial valves were made respectively by Mitral Medical Inc. (now part of the Sorin group), Edwards Laboratories (now Edwards Lifesciences) and the Sorin Group. All three laboratories have devised different techniques of valve construction with the aim of reducing or abolishing the risk of tissue abrasion. The specialists at Mitral Medical Inc. retained the technique of mounting the pericardium outside the stent as in the original Ionescu valve, but found other ways of reducing abrasion. The Edwards engineers used an ingenious way of mounting the pericardium inside the stent albeit with a minimum loss of useful opening flow area. The Sorin technicians devised yet another way of mounting the pericardium in a double layer so as to have the stent margin padded with a pericardial sheet (similar to one of Shiley's modifications).

The Edwards valve became available in 1980. The device made in the configuration for mitral replacement had to be withdrawn, after implantation in a small number of patients, because of excessive flexibility of the stent causing mitral incompetence. A new redesigned version of this valve was reintroduced in 1984. The Mitroflow valve, as first manufactured by Mitral Medical in 1982, had to be redesigned because it showed a failure mode similar to the first generation of pericardial valves. Since 1991 a modified version of this valve was introduced and has been used in a large number of patients. The additional changes made in the configuration of these two valves demonstrate, once again, the advantage of the versatility of the 'man-made concept' of the pericardial valve.

The haemodynamic characteristics of these 3 types of valve are similar to the excellent results found with the original Ionescu-Shiley valve as described by Tandon's group.

The minor differences in gradients and in calculated surface area do not show a significant difference at clinical level. The adjacent image portrays the opening characteristics of 4 pericardial valves - Hancock (no longer available), Mitroflow, Edwards and Shiley. The cusps of these valves open synchronously up to a very large surface area only minimally different from one valve to another. All 4 valves were manufactured for clinical use and all were 25mm in diameter. The valves were photographed under identical conditions in the mitral side of a 'pulse duplicator' and the flow rates, at peak of diastole were: for each frame, from left to right: 0, 100, 200, 300, and 400 ml/s.

Regarding infective endocarditis, embolic complications and bleeding due to anticoagulant treatment, there is only scant data in the publications analysed for this article. It is presumed, and not without good reason, that the main emphasis was placed by the authors on structural valve deterioration (SVD). It can also be considered logical that these three types of pericardial valves, having a similar structure and dynamic function as the original Ionescu pericardial valve, such complications, 'grosso modo', would have occurred at about the same rate as reported by the users of the Ionescu valve as already reported in this article.

The scientific publications on these three, second generation pericardial valves are not only few in number but they lack some of the necessary, standardised data for a complete, clear and fair evaluation of the results. In order to avoid generalities and averages, the data reporting SVD is presented in the form of tables.

Table IV. Mitroflow Pericardial Valve

Main Author/Year	No. of patients. Valve location	Patient mean age (range)	No. of SVD, position	Actuarial freedom from SVD-years
Revuelta, 1990	130 - All, 90 - A, 27 - M, 10 - D	55.4 (26-74)	1 Aortic, 4 Mitral	At 7 years, all valves 86%
Loisance, 1993	199 - All, 107 - A, 63 - M, 28 - D, 1 - T	58		At 5 years 94.6%. At 10 years 63.7%
Sjogren, 2006	152 Aortic	79.5 (75-91)		At 5 years 99%. At 10 years 82%
Benhameid, 2008	161 Aortic	69.5 (60-94)	19 in group 60-69, 6 in group >70 years	At 15 years: 60-70- 62%, >70- 73%
Yankah, 2008	1513 Aortic	72.4	122. Stenosis 36.7%, regurgitant 20.4%, both 42.9%	At 20 years: >70- 84.8%
Jamieson, 2009	381 Aortic from 3 centres	76.4 (53-91)		At 10 years: <60- 85.2%, >60- 85%, 61-70- 95.7%, >70- 83.2%

A = Aortic; M = Mitral; D = Mitral and Aortic, T = Tricuspid, SVD = Structural Valve Deterioration.

The lack of standardised data presented in the various publications makes interpretation difficult. The discrepancy of the actuarially presented results between the various publications is evident.

Table V. Edwards Pericardial Valve

Main Author, Year	No. of patients. Valve location	Patient mean age (range)	No. of SVD, position	Actuariel freedom from SVD-years
Pelletier, 1990	284 - All, 222 - A, 77 - M, 2 - T	58 (19-79)	3 valves. 1 - M regurgitation at 26 months, 2 A - thrombus at 20 months, tear at 68 months	Reoperation for all causes SBE, SVD, perivalvular leak. Overall 92% at 6 years
Jamieson, 1999. Multicentre report	429 all Mitral, 318 - M, 101 -D	60.7	Calcification 70.4%, leaflet tear 18.5%, both 11.1%	At 10 years: age <40 -80%, 41-50 - 91%, 51-60 - 84%, 61-70 - 95%
Marchand, 2001	435 all Mitral, 333 - M, 102 - D	60.7 (8-82)	56 episodes: Calcification 73%, tears 20%, both 7%. Duration to explant 9.5 years (5-13.6)	At 14 years: All patients 66.3%, <65- 62.8%, >65- 85.9%
Biglioli, 2004	327 all Aortic, 298 study group	67.2 (19-83),215 patients aged > 65	Considerable increase on the risk of prosthesis replacement after 10 years post op.	At 14 years: all patients 52.9%, <65- 35.8%, >65- 83.7%
McClure, 2010	1000 all Aortic	74.1	26 valves	At 15 years: age <65- 34.7%, 65-75- 89.4%, >75- 99.5%

A= Aortic; M= Mitral; T = Tricuspid; SVD = Structural Valve Deterioration; SBE = Subacute Bacterial Endocarditis

The inverse relationship between the age of the patients and the rate of SVD is obvious in most reports.

There are very significant differences among the various publications concerning the figures of actuarial freedom from SVD. Published data from Dr. Carpentier on structural dysfunction of the valve which carries his name would have been useful, but a search through the relevant medical literature, has not revealed any such publications.

Table VI. Sorin Pericarbon Pericardial Valve

Main Author, Year	No. of patients.Valve location	Patient mean age (range)	No. of SVD, position	Actuarial freedom from SVD-years
Folliguet, 2001	277 all, 224 - A, 39 - M, 10 - D, 3 - P	178 > 75 years (64.3%)	3 Aortic, 2 at 7 years, 1 at 2 years	At 10 years: All patients - 96.6%, Aortic 96.1%, Mitral 100% (i)
Grabenwoger, 1994	144 all, 114 - A, 25 - M, 5 D	69	9 valves - 3 mitral, 6 Aortic. 7 stenotic, 2 regurgitant, 9 calcified; Valve failure at +/- 55 months post implant	(ii) See below
Caimmi, 1998	78 all mitral	56.9	26 Calcified-stenosis	At 12 years: 56.8% all. <60- 36.8%; >60- 86.3%
Seguin, 1998 multicentre report	321 Aortic	75.8	6 Valves - calcification	At 10 years - 83.9%

A =Aortic; M = Mitral; D = Mitral and Aortic; T = Tricuspid; P = Pulmonary; SVD = Structural Valve Deterioration.

(i) This figure should be interpreted with caution because the study was of only 39 patients with mitral replacement and only 2 patients were at risk at 10 years. The patients' ages were not supplied in detail.

(ii) This study describes only the pathology of failed valves in 9 patients (out of a series of 144), 51 –79 years old (mean 69) followed-up for 6 – 8 years. The description of clinical use and results of the 144 patients who received Sorin Pericarbon Pericardial Valves would have been of great interest, but a search through the relevant medical literature has not found any such publication from the surgical team.

- The symptoms of valvular stenosis due to calcification are insidious and often well tolerated by the patient. The reported SVD rate may be lower than would have been, if the valves were assessed by echocardiography. This pertains to the figures in tables IV, V and VI.

There are very few published reports containing sufficient data in order to be useful. One can only note, without much comment, the gross difference between the SVD shown in these three tables.

A scientific comparison among these 3 second generation valves, and between them and the Ionescu-Shiley valves is practically impossible. The number of patients in the published series varies considerably.

For the Shiley valves there had been an almost equal distribution of mitral and aortic replacements. For the new generation valves, the ratio was about 5:1 in favour of the aortic valve. The much smaller number of mitral valve replacements is due in part to the reduction of mitral valve disease in the general population and, at the same time, because of the increase in the number of patients with degenerative aortic valve disease in a progressively aging population. Another reason appears to be the perception of some surgeons that pericardial valves in the mitral position are more susceptible to SVD, than in the aortic position. The time-frame of their usage also varies. Surgical techniques and experience in general have evolved over the past 40 years. The lessons from the past might have borne fruit. The experience with the Shiley valves shows that 75-80% of valve failure was due to calcification and only 20-25% failed because of abrasion and possibly because of design flaws. The knowledge about the type of valve failure - abrasion and, especially, calcification - have placed tissue valves in a new perspective and gave the surgeons a different outlook. The greatest achievement after the first 10–15 years of usage of the first pericardial valves, was the realisation of the inverse relationship between patient age and valve calcification. This was known before, from the porcine valve experience, but it has not received sufficient emphasis until the use of pericardial valves.

The data presented in the above three tables allow one to draw some conclusions based on existing factual results but also on overall general impressions.

The second generation of pericardial valves have only occasionally failed due to tissue abrasion, although tears have still occurred.

Calcification of the tissue occurred later in elderly patients because mineralisation develops later and advances slower in old age.

These modified valves have been used preferentially, if not exclusively, in older patients and in a considerably larger proportion for aortic valve replacement rather than in the mitral position where the risk of SVD was, and remains, higher. These elements distort significantly all chance of a comparison with the series of Shiley valves.

During the 1970s and 80s, Shiley pericardial valves had been used in patients of all ages, and particularly in patients under the age of 65 years. During the 1990s and into the following decade, the mean age of patients receiving the second generation of pericardial valves varied between 67.2 and 72 years, a very significant difference in age.

The technical improvements made in the second generation of valves has apparently reduced the risk of cusp abrasion. This advantage was not fully exploited because these valves were used only in a small proportion in young patients who would have benefited more from this technical advancement. Despite claims that all 3 types of second generation valves were treated with 'so-called' anticalcification processes, the clinical results have not shown any benefit from such chemical treatment. The only reason for the reduced rate of calcification - and therefore of structural valve deterioration - in patients receiving these second generation valves was the advanced age of the patients who received them. The age of the patients was shifted from a mean of around 50 years with Shiley valves, to a mean of between 67 and 72 years with the second generation valves.

It is regretable that pericardial valves, which are known to carry a very low risk of embolisation, were not used more often in the mitral position where the need and benefit would have been greater.

However, in general, the second generation pericardial valves represent a progress in the armoury of devices for the treatment of heart valve disease. If the process of valve calcification could be controlled, these pericardial valves would become the panacea for patients in need of heart valve replacement.

In general, it is known that success depends on knowing how long it will take to succeed. For the time being, one has to accept that most of the aspects of the present are accessible only to Prophesy, about the future, the understanding of the phenomenon 'calcification' and its prevention, may lay somewhere beyond the horizon.

A short history of the introduction in clinical use of valves made of animal tissue for heart valve replacement in humans allows us to appreciate the evolution of this chapter of cardiac surgery and to imagine future potential developments in this field.

1965 Duran and Gunning in Oxford, England, published their experimental work of implanting porcine aortic valves in dogs and the previous year they had already performed the first successful porcine aortic valve replacement in one human patient.

1965 Binet and associates in Paris, France, began the use of porcine aortic valves for aortic valve replacement in humans.

1967 Ionescu and associates in Leeds, England, used for the first time porcine aortic valves mounted on an original valve support for mitral valve replacement in humans.

1969 Hancock Laboratory in Irvine, California introduces the first commercially available porcine aortic valve for use in patients.

1969 Carpentier and associates in Paris, France, advocate the use of glutaraldehyde for chemical treatment of porcine aortic valves.

1971 Ionescu and others in Leeds, England, creates the first bovine pericardial heart valve and begins its implantation in humans.

1980 Since the early 1980s several modified pericardial valves have been built. Three of them with improved characteristics are being successfully used, as shown in this article.

The two important creative stages in tissue heart valves (from 1964 to 1971) took place in a short space of seven years and that since 1971 when the concept of 'man-made pericardial valves' was created, no other significant invention has occurred in this field except the use of bovine pericardium in the construction of transcatheter valves for aortic valve replacement.

The porcine valve was used successfully under several names, made by different laboratories, with various modifications and slight improvements without becoming essentially different from the original, native, pig's valve shape. However, the porcine valve, although far from perfect, was very useful in helping a large number of patients over many years.

The bovine pericardial valve had been created in 1971 and over the following 4 decades, with various modifications and improvements made by different , it became, due to its superior overall qualities, the tissue valve of choice for the great majority of surgical groups around the world.

The pericardial valve is not simply another valve, it is the embodiment of a concept of tissue valve construction. At present the bovine pericardium is being used, tomorrow perchance an even better material will be found.

In this respect, Ionescu made, in one of his early papers, a significant and rather prophetic statement:

The physico-chemical and biological properties of the natural porcine aortic valve have been profoundly altered by various interventions in order to adapt it for therapeutic means. In this way, the porcine valve has lost all its primordial characteristics except its shape which remains unchanged and unchangeable. The pericardial valve, on the other hand, has been conceived as an entirely 'man-made' valve and therefore its shape and general characteristics can be altered through a multitude of interventions in order to optimise its function

Adhuc sub judice lis est: Quintus Horatius Flaccus (68-8 BC)

=== Addenda ===
Contrary to what is mentioned in this article, a short publication, co-authored by A. Carpentier, was found. It presents a small series of 61 patients who received isolated aortic valve replacement with Carpentier-Edwards pericardial valves. The authors state that at 6 years of follow-up 'there have been no cases of periprosthetic leak, no cardiac insufficiency and no thromboembolism' This short article does not contain any other 'significant' information.

In a recent publication Dr. Denton A Cooley, who used a very large number of Ionescu-Shiley Pericardial Xenografts, mentioned the following: I still have surviving patients with functioning Bjork-Shiley and Ionescu-Shiley valves, some of which were implanted 30 or more years ago.

There are now more than 40 years since Doctor Ionescu introduced, for the first time, the glutaraldehyde treated bovine pericardium in clinical use in the form of a three cusp heart valve (The Ionescu-Shiley Pericardial Xenograft). It is of interest to know that now, 40 years later, the bovine pericardium is still used in three medical/surgical devices.

1. The second generation of Pericardial Xenografts as described in the above article are used in large numbers.

2. For the manufacture of "Transcatheter Aortic Valve Implantation" devices which are used in progressively larger numbers of selected patients, especially in Europe.

3. For the manufacturing of cardiac ventricular chambers in an experimental artificial heart under testing in a French laboratory.

== See also ==
- Heart disease § Valvular heart disease
- Marian Ionescu
