= Aortic sinus =

Anatomic dilation in the left heart

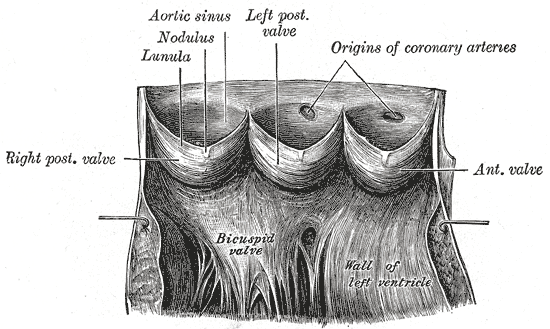
- Aorta laid open to show the semilunar valves. (N.B. captions don't align with current terminology)

Details
- Synonyms: sinus of Valsalva

Identifiers
- Latin: sinus aortae
- MeSH: D012850
- TA98: A12.2.03.002
- TA2: 4001
- FMA: 3745

An aortic sinus, also known as a sinus of Valsalva, is one of the anatomic dilations of the ascending aorta, which occurs just above the aortic valve. These widenings are between the wall of the aorta and each of the three cusps of the aortic valve.

The aortic sinuses cause eddies which prevent the valve cusps from touching the internal surface of the aorta and obstructing the openings of the coronary arteries.

== Structure ==
There are generally three aortic sinuses, one anterior and two posterior sinuses. These give rise to coronary arteries:

- The left aortic or left posterior aortic sinus gives rise to the left coronary artery;
- The right aortic or anterior aortic sinus gives rise to the right coronary artery;
- The posterior aortic or right posterior aortic sinus usually gives rise to no vessels. It is often known as the non-coronary sinus.

The aortic sinuses are typically more prominent than the pulmonary sinuses.

== Clinical significance ==
If the coronary arteries arise from the wrong aortic sinuses, this can put the heart's ventricles at risk of ischaemia. This is often only discovered when a heart attack has already occurred, usually before the age of 20 and during exercise.

== Names ==
Each aortic sinus can also be referred to as the sinus of Valsalva, the sinus of Morgagni, the sinus of Mehta, the sinus of Otto, or Petit's sinus.

== See also ==
- Aneurysm of sinus of Valsalva
