= Oliver's sign =

- Differential diagnosis: aneurysm of the aortic arch.

Oliver's sign, or the tracheal tug sign, is an abnormal downward movement of the trachea during systole that can indicate a dilation or aneurysm of the aortic arch.

Oliver's sign is elicited by gently grasping the cricoid cartilage and applying upward pressure while the patient stands with their chin extended upward. Due to the anatomic position of the aortic arch, which overrides the left main bronchus, a downward tug of the trachea may be felt if an aneurysm is present. It is also seen in light anaesthesia.

The sign was first described by English military surgeon William Silver Oliver in 1878.

== See also ==
- Aortic aneurysm
- Cardarelli's sign
