= Sir James Ross, 1st Baronet =

British general surgeon

Sir James Paterson Ross, 1st Baronet, KCVO FRCS (26 May 1895 – 5 July 1980) was a British general surgeon, who was surgeon to King George VI and, from 1952, Surgeon to the Queen.

Ross' son, Sir (James) Keith Ross, 2nd Baronet (1927–2003), was also a surgeon.

Coat of arms of Sir James Ross, 1st Baronet
Crest A hawk rising Sable between two branches of juniper leaved and fructed Proper. Escutcheon Per pale Argent and Sable a chevron between in chief a lion passant and in base an anchor all counterchanged. Motto Doucement

Baronetage of the United Kingdom
New creation	Baronet (of Whetstone); 1960–1980	Succeeded by Keith Ross
