= Donald Longmore =

British heart surgeon (1928–2023)

Professor Donald Longmore OBE FRCSEd FRCR
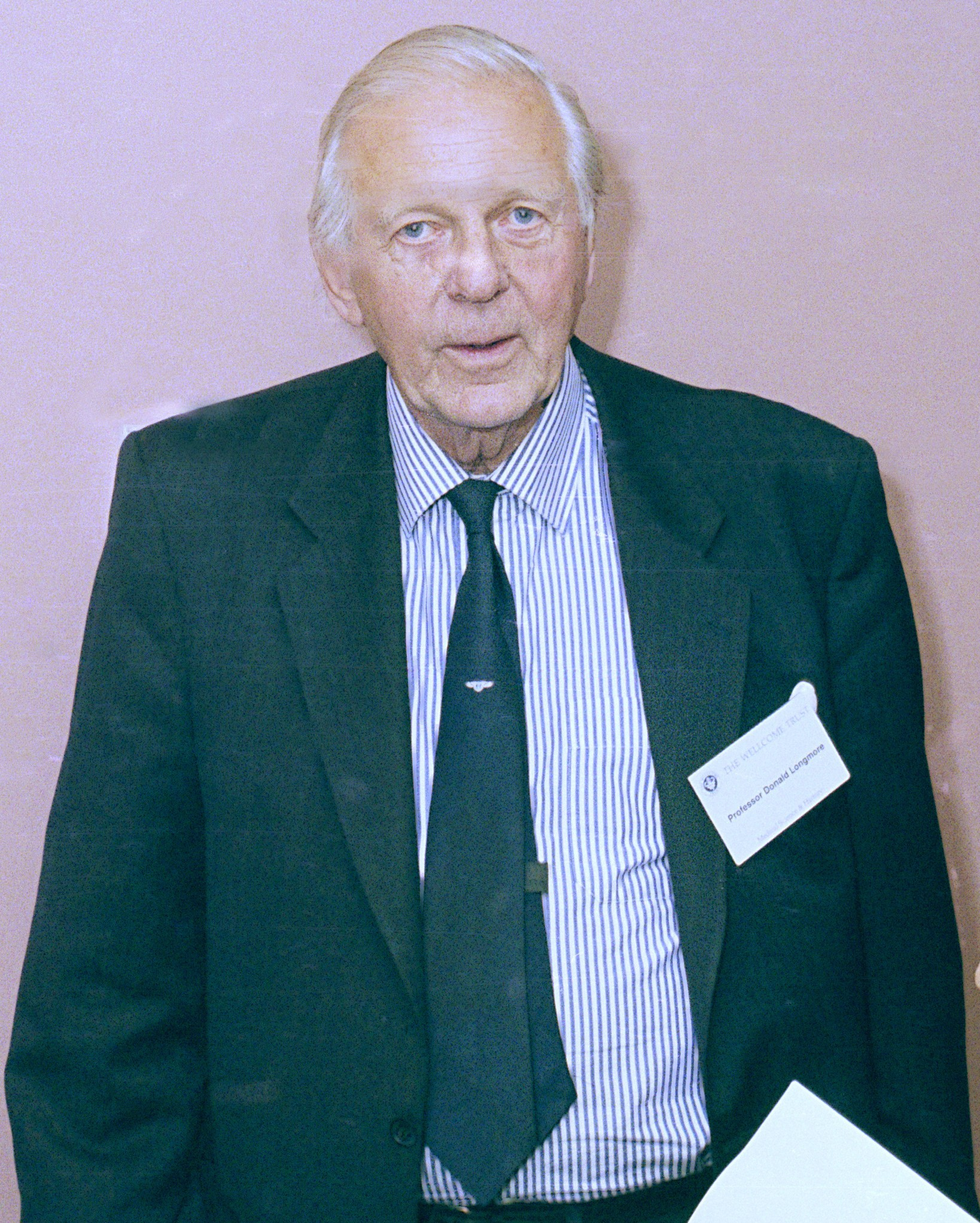
- Longmore in June 1997
- Born: Donald Bernard Longmore; 20 February 1928
- Died: 31 October 2023 (aged 95)
- Occupations: Consultant surgeon; Clinical physiologist

Donald Bernard Longmore, OBE, FRCSEd, FRCR (9 June 1928 – 31 October 2023) was a British consultant surgeon and clinical physiologist. He was one of the team who performed the first heart transplant in the United Kingdom.

== Biography ==
Donald Bernard Longmore was born on 20 February 1928. He was a Consultant Surgeon and Clinical Physiologist at the National Heart Hospital from 1963 to 1980. On 3 May 1968, together with Donald Ross and Keith Ross, he performed the first heart transplant in the United Kingdom, which was also only the eleventh in the world.

From 1982 to 1993 he worked as Professor of Magnetic Resonance in Medicine and Director of the Magnetic Resonance Unit, at the Royal Brompton National Heart and Lung Hospital, where he was latterly Emeritus.

Longmore also held management positions in companies delivering magnetic resonance services.

Longmore was made an Officer of the Order of the British Empire (OBE) in the 1999 New Year Honours, "for services to Magnetic Resonance Scanning". Imperial College named their "CORDA Donald Longmore PhD Fellowship" to honour Longmore. He is a Fellow of the Royal College of Surgeons of Edinburgh (FRCSEd) and a Fellow of the Royal College of Radiologists (FRCR).

Donald died at home on 31 October 2023, aged 95.

== Works ==
- Spare-part Surgery. M.Ross-Macdonald (ed.). London: Aldus Books Ltd. 1968. ISBN 978-0-490-00111-4.
