= William Silver Oliver =

Irish-born Canadian military surgeon

William Silver Oliver, M.D. (1836 in Kilfinane – 27 April 1908 in Farnborough) was an Irish-born Canadian military surgeon remembered for describing Oliver's sign. He graduated in Halifax, Nova Scotia, and entered the Army in 1857, serving mainly in India and Canada. He was Honorary Deputy Surgeon-General, stationed at Halifax, Nova Scotia, on his retirement in 1883. He designed the Canadian Army's infantry equipment after serving with the 60th Rifles and witnessing first hand the needs of infantry soldiers. He died after a long illness, having spent the last 3 years of his life in England.
