= Ross baronets =

Baronetcy in the Baronetage of the United Kingdom

There have been two baronetcies created for persons with the surname Ross, both in the Baronetage of the United Kingdom. One creation is extinct while one is still extant.

The Ross Baronetcy, of Dunmoyle in the County of Tyrone, was created in the Baronetage of the United Kingdom on 15 February 1919 for the Irish lawyer John Ross. He later served as the last Lord Chancellor of Ireland. His son, Sir Ronald Ross, 2nd Baronet, represented Londonderry in the House of Commons as an Ulster Unionist. On his death in 1958, the title became extinct.

The Ross Baronetcy, of Whetstone in the County of Middlesex, was created in the Baronetage of the United Kingdom on 26 January 1960 for James Ross, surgeon to Queen Elizabeth II from 1952 to 1964 and President of the Royal College of Surgeons from 1957 to 1959. His eldest son, the second Baronet, was also a prominent surgeon. As of 2010 the title is held by the latter's son, the third Baronet, who succeeded in 2003.

== Ross baronets, of Dunmoyle (1919) ==
- Sir John Ross, 1st Baronet (1854–1935)
- Sir Ronald Deane Ross, 2nd Baronet (1888–1958)

== Ross baronets, of Whetstone (1960) ==
- Sir James Paterson Ross, 1st Baronet (1895–1980)
- Sir (James) Keith Ross, 2nd Baronet (1927–2003)
- Sir Andrew Charles Paterson Ross, 3rd Baronet (born 1966)

The heir apparent is James Joseph Paterson Ross (born 1999)

Coat of arms of Ross baronets
Crest A hawk rising Sable between two branches of juniper leaved and fructed Proper. Escutcheon Per pale Argent and Sable a chevron between in chief a lion passant and in base an anchor all counterchanged. Motto Doucement

== See also ==
- Lockhart-Ross baronets
