= Keith Ross (surgeon) =

British consultant cardiac surgeon

Sir Keith Ross Bt FRCS
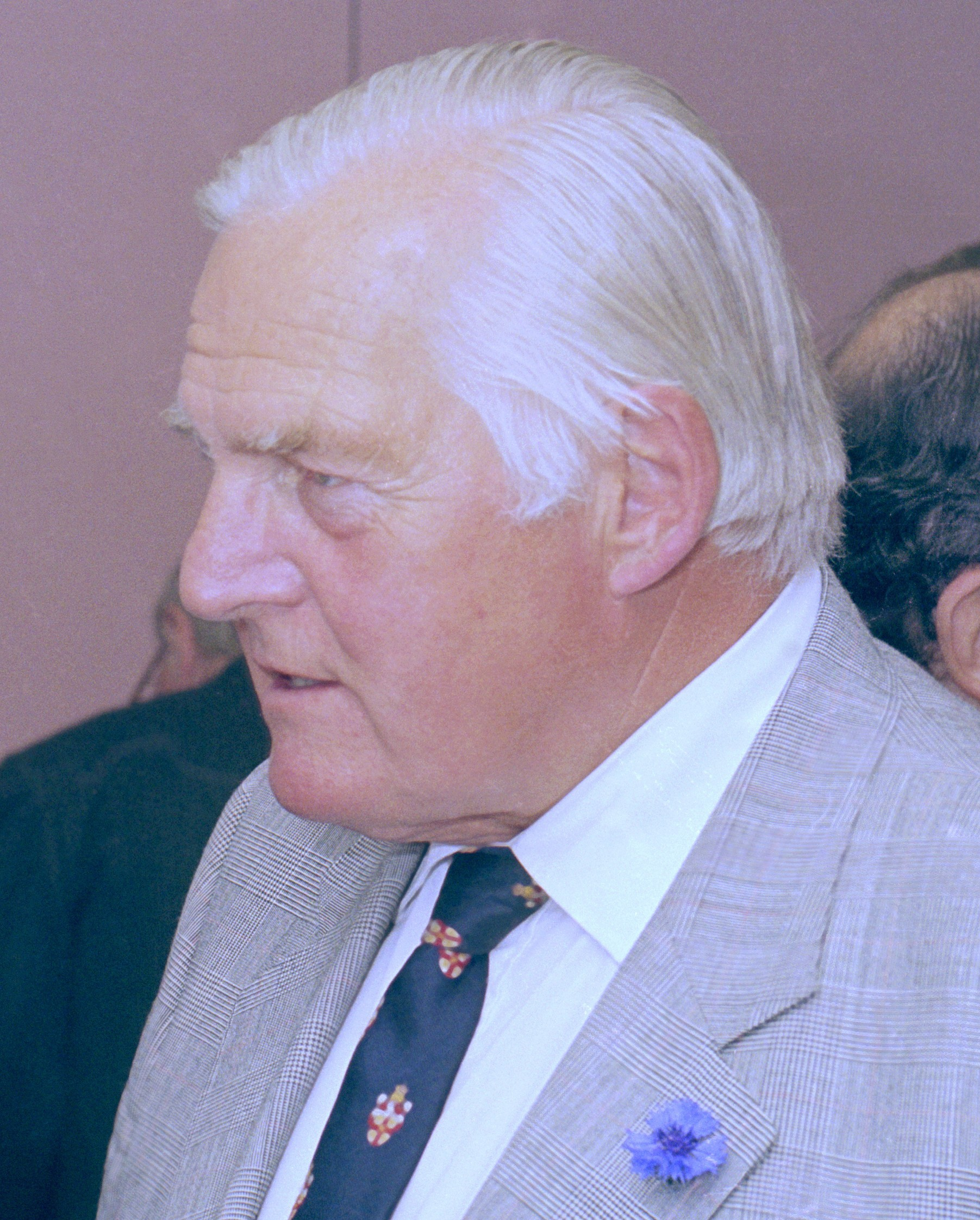
- Ross in June 1997
- Born: James Keith Ross; 9 May 1927
- Died: 18 February 2003 (aged 75)
- Occupation: Consultant cardiac surgeon

Sir James Keith Ross, 2nd Baronet, FRCS (9 May 1927 – 18 February 2003) was a British consultant cardiac surgeon. He was one of the team who performed the first heart transplant in the United Kingdom.

== Early life ==
Ross was born in London on 9 May 1927, the son of Sir James Paterson Ross, Surgeon to the Royal Household, and Marjorie Burton Townsend, a former surgical ward sister at St Bartholomew's Hospital.

Ross was educated at The Hall School, Hampstead and St Paul's School. He qualified in medicine at Middlesex Hospital prior to undertaking mostly sea-based National Service in the Royal Naval Reserve. He then returned to the Middlesex Hospital.

In 1956, Ross passed the Fellow of the Royal College of Surgeons (FRCS) examinations. He proceeded to undertake training in cardiothoracic surgery at the Brompton Hospital and also in San Francisco, where he held a Fulbright Scholarship and worked with Frank Gerbode. While in the US, he conducted research into heart grafts that resulted in a thesis for his masters in surgery and also a Hunterian professorship.

== Career ==
Ross worked as Senior Registrar at the Middlesex and Harefield Hospitals from 1961 to 1964 and then as a Consultant Surgeon at Harefield Hospital from 1964 to 1967. He was Consultant Surgeon at the National Heart Hospital from 1967 to 1972. On 3 May 1968, together with Donald Ross (no relation) and Donald Longmore, he performed the first heart transplant in the United Kingdom, which was also only the eleventh in the world.

From 1972 to 1990, Ross was Consultant Cardiac Surgeon, for the Wessex Region, based at Southampton.

Ross served as a member of the Council of the RCS from 1986 to 1994 and as President of the Society of Cardiothoracic Surgeons in 1988. He was chair of the RCS's Working Party on Cardiac Transplantation from 1990 to 1992. He was awarded the Bruce Medal of the Royal College of Surgeons of Edinburgh in 1989, which is a recognition granted only occasionally since its inception in 1966.

== Personal life ==
Ross was an accomplished painter, who twice had pictures accepted for the Royal Academy Summer Exhibition and sold both. He was also a keen angler, woodworker and sailor.

On the death of his father in 1980, Ross became second baronet. He died suddenly at his former hospital in Southampton on 18 February 2003 after initially successful treatment for a dissecting aneurysm of the aortic arch. He is survived by his son and three daughters. His son, Andrew Charles Paterson Ross, succeeded him as third baronet.

== Arms ==
Coat of arms of Keith Ross
Crest A hawk rising Sable between two branches of juniper leaved and fructed Proper. Escutcheon Per pale Argent and Sable a chevron between in chief a lion passant and in base an anchor all counterchanged. Motto Doucement

Baronetage of the United Kingdom
Preceded by James Ross	Baronet (of Whetstone); 1980–2003	Succeeded by Andrew Ross
