= Antonio Cardarelli =

Italian politician

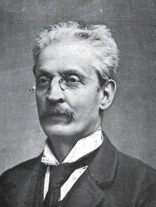
Antonio Cardarelli

Antonio Cardarelli (29 March 1831, Civitanova del Sannio – 8 January 1927) was an Italian physician remembered for describing Cardarelli's sign.

== Biography ==
Antonio Cardarelli trained at the Collegio Medico di San Aniello of the University of Naples, graduating with a doctorate in 1853. He worked at the Ospedale degli Incurabili, becoming professor of medical pathology in 1890 and then professor of clinical medicine. In addition to his eponymous sign, the Ospedale Antonio Cardarelli and the Via Antonio Cardarelli in Naples are also named after him.
