= Donald Ross (surgeon) =

British thoracic surgeon

- Born: 4 October 1922; South Africa
- Died: 7 July 2014 (aged 91); London, Britain
- Education: University of Cape Town
- Occupations: Doctor, thoracic surgeon
- Years active: 1947-1997
- Known for: First heart transplantation in the United Kingdom; Ross procedure

Donald Nixon Ross, FRCS (4 October 1922 – 7 July 2014) was a South African-born British thoracic surgeon who was a pioneer of cardiac surgery and led the team that carried out the first heart transplantation in the United Kingdom in 1968. He developed the pulmonary autograft, known as the Ross procedure, for treatment of aortic valve disease.

== Early life and education ==
Donald Ross was born in Kimberley, South Africa, on 4 October 1922. His parents were Scottish. He matriculated from Kimberley Boys' High School in 1939.

He began his medical career enrolling as a student at the University of Cape Town, training first as a dedicated scientist and subsequently as a doctor. He graduated (BSc, MB, ChB) in 1946 with first-class honours and the university gold medal. He had also received a two-year overseas scholarship which allowed him to further his studies in the United Kingdom.

== Career in surgery in England ==
Ross has recalled eagerly accepting the scholarship: once in England he took up a career in surgery and became a Fellow of the Royal College of Surgeons (1949) within two years instead of the usual three. Working initially in Bristol he focused on chest and oesophageal surgery, and then began to include early cardiac surgery, such as on the ductus arteriosus. He was appointed Senior Registrar in Thoracic Surgery, Bristol, in 1952.

Ross acknowledges the particular influence on his career of two key figures: Ronald Belsey, MD, and Russell Claude Brock, FRCS, FRCP (later Lord Brock). Ross has recorded how Belsey, the oesophageal surgeon in Bristol with whom he was working, took him to Guy's Hospital in London to see Sir Russell Brock attempt to split open a calcified aortic valve. "There was no open-heart surgery in those days, and the operation was a dramatic failure. But the drama involved convinced me that I had to study new developments in cardiac surgery."

Ross had been a fellow student of Christiaan Barnard at the University of Cape Town, the man who carried out the world's first heart transplantation at Cape Town's Groote Schuur Hospital. Throughout his early training, moreover, he had felt a lure toward chest surgery and cardiology because they seemed to be the most active specialities in an era when very little could be done for a patient with heart disease of any type.

Dr Brock, in charge of surgery at Guy's Hospital, took on Mr Ross as a cardiovascular Research Fellow (1953) and later as Senior Thoracic Registrar (1954). Four years later, in 1958, Ross was appointed Consultant Cardiothoracic Surgeon, and subsequently Consultant Surgeon, National Heart Hospital in London (1963), and Senior Surgeon there (1967). In 1970, he was made Director of the Department of Surgery at the Institute of Cardiology, London.

Ross retired in 1997.

== First heart transplantation in the United Kingdom ==
It was in 1968 that Donald Ross led the team of doctors (including Keith Ross (no relation) and Donald Longmore and the anaesthetist Alan Gilston.) and nurses at the National Heart Hospital in London in the United Kingdom's first heart transplantation. The operation, on a 45-year-old man, lasted 7 hours. The patient survived for another 46 days before dying from what was described at the time as an "overwhelming infection."

Looking back, Ross observed that it was almost logical that he should lead the team for the United Kingdom's first transplantation. "Operations on the open heart introduced the need to be able to deal with a quiescent heart action, so like most cardiac surgeons, I was involved in operating on an arrested heart and, as an extension of that, a quiescent transplanted heart…We felt that transplantation was a natural evolution."

There had been a surge of media attention around the heart transplantation, but the team had not considered the surgery itself particularly unique or challenging. The greatest issue faced was overcoming rejection of the newly transplanted heart. "We did not feel we had achieved any particular advances in transplantation at that time," Ross has said, "and we stopped after the third transplantation because the problem of rejection had not been overcome."

== The Ross procedure ==
Ross's greater achievement was the development, in 1967, of what has been termed the Ross procedure, or pulmonary autograft for aortic valve disease.

He has said that his interest had lain "particularly with the valves—especially the aortic valve—but, in general, anything that was related to the function of the heart." Initially he was involved in developing a bypass machine and the use of hypothermia to facilitate open heart surgery.

In 1962 Ross introduced the use of homografts to replace diseased aortic valves. He used a technique of subcoronary implantation developed in the laboratory by Carlos Duran and Alfred Gunning in Oxford.

Despite early promise, homografts had a limited life span of around 8 years. The pulmonary autograft, now widely known as the Ross procedure, first performed in 1967, was the logical development of the homograft: it involves replacing a patient's damaged aortic valve with his or her own pulmonary valve.

Ross believed that, "with care, the patient's own living pulmonary valve could be transplanted to replace the diseased aortic valve in that critical and vulnerable position and that it could persist there permanently." The benefits of the procedure were that it did not require lifelong anticoagulation with its attendant risks, and it could grow proportionately with the patient, making it suitable for use in children.

== Honours and awards ==
Ross is recipient of the following honours and awards:

- Honorary FRCSI, 1984
- Honorary FRCS Thailand, 1987.
- Honorary DSc CNAA, 1982.
- Clement Price Thomas Award, Royal College of Surgeons, 1983.
- Order of Cedar of Lebanon, 1975;
- Order of Merit (1st class) (West Germany), 1981;
- Royal Order (Thailand), 1994.

== Publications ==
- A Surgeon's Guide to Cardiac Diagnosis, 1962;
- Co-authored Medical and Surgical Cardiology, 1968;
- Co-authored Biological Tissue in Heart Valve Replacement, 1972;
- He has also contributed to the British Medical Journal, The Lancet and other journals.

== On future prospects in cardiac surgery ==
In retirement, Mr Ross anticipated much in the future of cardiac surgery, for example, with respect to the burgeoning role of radiology in both the diagnosis and treatment of heart disease. He was an advocate for tissue engineering to address the worldwide shortage of human organs and tissues for transplantation procedures.

== Extramural interests ==
Outside of his medical pursuits, Ross bred Arabian horses, and he had been a devotee of the theatre, opera, and, particularly, chamber music at the Wigmore Hall.

== Death ==
Ross died in London on 7 July 2014.
