= Cardarelli's sign =

- Differential diagnosis: Aneurysm of the aortic arch

Cardarelli's sign is an abnormal pulsation to the right of the trachea that may be found in people with an aneurysm of the aortic arch.

It can be felt by pressing the right side of the trachea. A variation is Oliver's sign.

It is named for Antonio Cardarelli.
