= Alan Gilston =

British anaesthesiologist

Dr Alan Gilston FRCS, FFARCS
- Born: 1928; United Kingdom
- Died: 2005 (aged 76–77)
- Occupation: Anaesthesiologist

Dr Alan Gilston FRCS, FFARCS (1928-2005) was a British anaesthesiologist. He was one of the team who performed the first heart transplant in the United Kingdom.

== Early life ==
His grandfather was Israel Gitlesohn, Bradford's first shohet, who was from Lithuania.

== Career ==
Gilston was Senior Consultant Anaesthesiologist at the National Heart Hospital from 1967 to 1990. On 3 May 1968, he acted as anaesthetist for the first heart transplant in the United Kingdom, which was also only the eleventh in the world.

A founder of the World Federation of Societies of Intensive and Critical Care Medicine, he also served as its president.

He initiated the first World Congress on Intensive Care in 1974, and was its secretary-general.

He was founder and chairman of the Intensive Care Society. He later gave the society's inaugural Gilston Lecture, named by the society in his honour, and received their silver Medal.

He was a Fellow of the Royal College of Surgeons (FRCS), and a Fellow of the Royal College of Anaesthetists (FFARCS).
