= Marian Ionescu =

British cardiac surgeon (1929–2023)

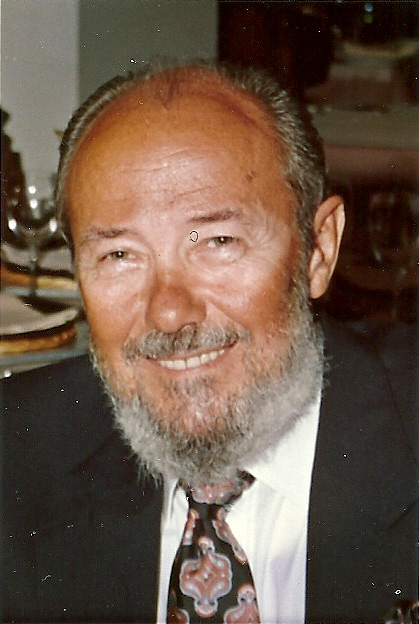
- Born: 21 August 1929; Târgoviște, Romania
- Died: 12 October 2023 (aged 94); Monaco
- Occupation: Cardiac surgeon

Marian Ion Ionescu (21 August 1929 – 12 October 2023) was a Romanian-born British cardiac surgeon. His interest in heart surgery covered several aspects of this specialty. He was an inventor of surgical devices, mostly artificial heart valves, a scientist in the broad term and a medical educator. Ionescu died on 12 October 2023, at the age of 94.

== Medicine ==
Marian Ionescu's entire medical career was dominated by scientific curiosity and a persistent desire and ability to make progress by creating change, by discovering the unknown, by improving the known and by inventing what he thought would be useful.

In 1959 in Cleveland, at Dr Kolff's impulse, he created the first 'single leaflet aortic valve' out of polyurethane. This device never went beyond the experimental stage due to clot formation. During 1961 and 1962 in Romania, he conducted, with his team, extensive experimental and clinical work on the physiology of organisms under deep hypothermia, with the aid of extracorporeal circulation, in animals and in man. The body temperature was lowered to between 6 and 15 °C and complete circulatory arrest of up to 56 minutes was maintained without significant negative effects.

At Leeds Ionescu designed, created and implanted in the mitral position in humans, for the first time ever, porcine aortic valves attached to a Teflon cloth collar, starting in February 1967. This was followed by the creation of the Dacron covered titanium frame for mounting the porcine aortic valves to be able to implant them in all three cardiac locations (mitral, aortic, tricuspid). With various modifications and improvements, these stent mounted valves had been implanted in 87 patients between February 1967 and March 1969. All these valves were treated with formaldehyde and this was the main reason for their limited durability. In a continuous search to create a tissue heart valve which could be used without anticoagulant treatment, Ionescu created a novel artificial valve. Using autologous fascia lata tissue (the fibrous membrane which covers the outside aspect of the thigh muscles) taken from the patient and used to construct the valve during the operation by mounting the living fascia on a Dacron-covered titanium frame in the shape of a three cusp valve. He began the clinical implantation of these valves in April 1969. This procedure of valve construction and implantation had been used in many centres in the world for about three years until it was realised that fascia lata did not perform well over longer periods of time in the high pressure environment of the left heart. These valves became incompetent after various durations after implantation – from 3 to 12 years. However, two important facts were established by the use of such valves. The haemodynamic performance in both mitral and aortic positions was superior to all known artificial heart valves and that the risk of thrombosis and embolisation was minimal when compared with mechanical valves. Freehand insertion of stentless fascia lata aortic valves was also used in a small number of cases with similar results.

In his continuous search for the 'Holy Grail', Ionescu experimented with valves made from bovine pericardium (the membrane which surrounds the heart) treated with glutaraldehyde and mounted on a Dacron covered titanium frame. This original valve, designed and created by Ionescu, demonstrated excellent hydrodynamic performance with good durability during in-vitro fatigue testing. In March 1971 Ionescu began the clinical implantation, for the first time, of this original device. The results were very encouraging. In 1976 Shiley Laboratory in California began to manufacture and to distribute worldwide this valve under the name of 'Ionescu–Shiley Pericardial Xenograft'. Its use by Ionescu and many other surgeons demonstrated very good performance in all aspects until 6 to 10 years post-operatively when signs of malfunction appeared progressively in younger patients and some of the valves had to be removed and replaced. Although a small percentage of the pericardial valves continued to function normally for up to 26 years post-implantation, the majority of them had to be replaced between 6 and 14 years, and a few some time later.

In the mid-eighties Shiley Company was acquired by the drug laboratory Pfizer. At around that time a series of severe problems were encountered with the mechanical Bjork–Shiley valve.

Some 10 years after the creation of the pericardial valve by Ionescu, and its use by numerous surgeons and after having demonstrated its excellent haemodynamic performance and the reduced propensity for thrombo-embolism, other companies began manufacturing and distributing a plethora of rather similar pericardial valves. None of these showed a better performance than the original Ionescu valve with the exception of a pericardial valve modified and built by Edwards Laboratories and commercialised under the name of 'Carpentier-Edwards Pericardial Bioprosthesis.' This valve is reported to perform better than its predecessor, the original Ionescu–Shiley valve. However, a correct comparison between these two valves cannot be made because the Ionescu valve had been used by most surgeons in patients of all age groups and mostly younger than 65 years, as was the custom in the Seventies and Eighties. The Edwards valve, on the other hand, is being used since the mid-eighties almost exclusively in patients above the age of 65–70 years in whom the risk of primary valve failure is now known to be significantly lower.

Ionescu also created the concept of performing multiple sequential haemodynamic investigations of patients following heart valve surgery, to evaluate, in time, the patient's condition.

In the field of congenital heart disease, Ionescu was the first surgeon to successfully reconstruct a heart with a single ventricle and continued to use various techniques for the repair of such a complex abnormality.

Pericardial valved conduit from the right ventricle to the pulmonary artery

For the repair of congenital cyanotic cardiac diseases he created and built, initially in his hospital laboratory, two original devices: the 'mono-cusp patch' for the correct enlargement of the narrowed pulmonary artery and annulus and a valved conduit (a tube containing a three-cusped valve) for cases with discontinuity between the right ventricle and the pulmonary artery. These devices were made of fascia lata and later, using glutaraldehyde treated bovine pericardium.

In 1987, Ionescu retired from active surgical work.

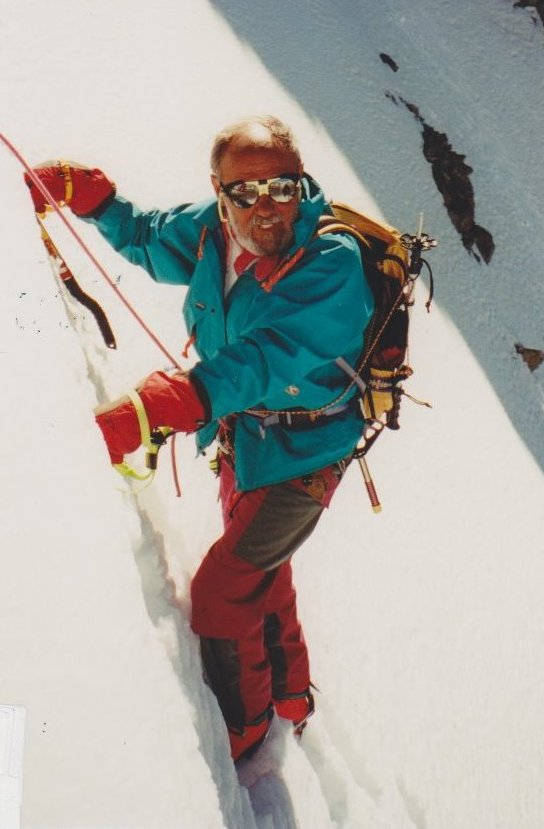
Ionescu on the Peutrey Ridge to the Mont Blanc summit

Ionescu practised high altitude climbing in the Northern Alps and the Himalayas where, during three expeditions, he stood on the top of five peaks around 7000 meters high.

== Quotes ==
"Progress is a continually ascending spiral, a stepwise extension of the horizon and of the quality of knowledge."

"The creation of the stented pericardial valve opened a door towards further potential improvements, as this valve, being entirely man-made, lends itself to a multitude of permutations of shape in order to further improve its long term performance."

== Publications ==
- 242 Original scientific articles on various aspects of cardiovascular and thoracic surgery have been published in several medical journals.
- 37 Chapters were published in books and treatises
- 10 Books written/edited as follows:

Collective Work (1962) Circulatia Extracorporeala si Hipotermia Profunda. Ed Academia R.P.R, Bucharest, Romania.

Marinescu V., Pausescu E., Ionescu M.I. Catecolaminele, Biologie si Patologue. Ed Academia R.P.R, (1965) Bucharest, Romania.

Ionescu M.I., Ross D.N., Wooler G.H. Biological Tissue in Heart Valve Replacement. Butterworths, (1972) London.

Ionescu M.I., Ross D.N., Wooler G.H. I Trapianti Valvorali Cardiaci con Tessuti Biologici.. Edizioni E.M.S.A., (1972), Napoli.

Ionescu M.I., Wooler G.H. Current Techniques in Extracorporeal Circulation. Butterworths, (!976), London.

Ionescu M.I. Tissue Heart Valves. Butterworths,(1979), London.

Ionescu M.I. Techniques in Extracorporeal Circulation. Butterworths,(1981), London.

Ionescu M.I., Cohn L.H. Mitral Valve Disease, Diagnosis and Treatment. Butterworths, (1985), London.

The Pericardial Heart Valve - The Odyssey of a Continuously Evolving Concept SCTS, (2015) London

Perspectives in Cardiothoracic Surgery - The SCTS Ionescu University, Volume I SCTS, (2016), London

== Oral presentations ==
- 186 Papers presented at different scientific meetings
- 122 Lectures given by invitation at various universities and medical centres
- 22 Visits for 'round table' or surgical operative demonstrations

== Awards ==
- Member of 23 Scientific Societies
- Holder of 6 Fellowships
- Obtained 12 Awards and Honorary titles, the latest being the Society of Cardiothoracic Surgery in Great Britain and Ireland Lifetime Achievement Award for Cardiac Surgery (March 2015)
