= Bicuspid aortic valve =

- Other names: Bicommissural aortic valve
- The aortic valve controls outflow of blood from the left ventricle of the heart through the aorta (valve is indicated within the yellow highlighted box). A normal aortic valve is tricuspid. Five types of bicuspid valve are shown, with Type 1 being most prevalent. A bicuspid valve forms when the tissue surrounding one of the cusps (leaflets) of the valve fuses during fetal development. This developmental anomaly can have either a negative or no effect on the individual.
- Specialty: Cardiology

Bicuspid aortic valve (BAV) is a form of heart disease in which two of the leaflets of the aortic valve fuse during development in the womb resulting in a two-leaflet (bicuspid) valve instead of the normal three-leaflet (tricuspid) valve. BAV is the most common cause of heart disease present at birth and affects approximately 1.3% of adults. Normally, the mitral valve is the only bicuspid valve and this is situated between the heart's left atrium and left ventricle. Heart valves play a crucial role in ensuring the unidirectional flow of blood from the atria to the ventricles, or from the ventricle to the aorta or pulmonary trunk. BAV is normally inherited.

== Signs and symptoms ==
In many cases, a bicuspid aortic valve will cause no problems. People with BAV may become tired more easily than those with normal valvular function and have difficulty maintaining stamina for cardio-intensive activities due to poor heart performance caused by stress on the aortic wall.

=== Complications ===
==== Calcification ====
BAV may become calcified later in life, which may lead to varying degrees of severity of aortic stenosis that will manifest as murmurs. If the leaflets do not close correctly, aortic regurgitation can occur. If these become severe enough, they may require heart surgery. The heart is put under more stress in order to either pump more blood through a stenotic valve or attempt to circulate regurgitation blood through a leaking valve. Ultimately there is a risk of rupture in the aortic valve due to bicuspid aortopathy which is a result of progressive aortic dilation from the stress of having only two valve leaflets where three are normal.

==== Aortic lesions ====
One of the most notable associations with BAV is the tendency for these patients to present with ascending aortic aneurysmal lesions. The extracellular matrix of the aorta in patients with BAV shows marked deviations from that of the normal tricuspid aortic valve, specifically reduced Fibrillin-1. It is currently believed that an increase in the ratio of MMP2 (Matrix Metalloproteinases 2) to TIMP1 (tissue inhibitors of metalloproteinase) may be responsible for the abnormal degradation of the valve matrix and therefore lead to aortic dissection and aneurysm. However, other studies have also shown MMP9 involvement with no differences in TIMP expression. The size of the proximal aorta should be evaluated carefully during the workup. The initial diameter of the aorta should be noted and annual evaluation with CT scan, or MRI to avoid ionizing radiation, should be recommended to the patient; the examination should be conducted more frequently if a change in aortic diameter is seen. From this monitoring, the type of surgery that should be offered to the patient can be determined based on the change in size of the aorta.

==== Aortic narrowing ====
A bicuspid aortic valve may cause the heart's aortic valve to narrow (aortic stenosis). This narrowing prevents the valve from opening fully, which reduces or blocks blood flow from the heart to the body. In some cases, the aortic valve does not close tightly, causing blood to leak backward into the left ventricle.

Coarctation of the aorta (a congenital narrowing in the region of the ductus arteriosus) has also been associated with BAV.

== Pathophysiology ==
Heart bicuspid aortic valve anatomy.

Fusion of aortic valve leaflets occurs most commonly (≈80%) between the right coronary and left coronary leaflets (RL), which are the anterior leaflets of the aortic valve. Fusion also occurs between the right coronary and noncoronary leaflets (RN, ≈17%), and least commonly between the noncoronary and left coronary leaflets (≈2%). In comparison to other fusion patterns, RN leaflet fusion has a stronger association with future complications such as aortic valve regurgitation and stenosis. However, all fusion patterns associate with a specific area or areas of dilated enlargement in either the root of the ascending aorta, the ascending aorta, or the transverse aortic arch.

=== Hemodynamics ===
Identifying hemodynamic patterns in the aorta after left ventricle systole aids in predicting consequential complications of bicuspid aortic valve. The patient-specific risk of developing complications such as aortic aneurysms is dependent on the particular aortic leaflet fusion pattern, with each pattern varying in 4D MRI measurements of wall shear stress (WSS), blood flow velocity, asymmetrical flow displacement and flow angle of the aorta.

BAV outflow is helical and occurs at high velocities (>1 m/s) throughout the ascending aorta. This is potentially more damaging to the aorta in comparison to the streamline flow and short-lived burst of high velocity at the beginning of the aorta, as seen within a healthy tricuspid valve. This eccentric outflow from the BAV results in blood hitting and reflecting off the aortic wall in a non-streamline fashion. The specific zones where blood hits is dependent on the varying BAV leaflet fusion patterns and consequently correlates with increases in WSS. WSS measurements in RL fusion indicate an increase in pressure applied predominantly to the right-anterior side of the vessel wall, while RN fusion increases WSS on the right-posterior wall. The resulting rise in WSS is supported by the asymmetrical displacement of blood flow produced by an increased angle of outflow from the BAV. Displacement is measured as the distance in millimeters from the center of the aorta to the center of the high velocity outflow. Blood does not flow centrally through the aorta in BAV, but along the right-anterior and right-posterior vessel wall for RL and RN leaflet fusion respectively.

=== Aortic disease ===
Identification of hemodynamics for RL, RN, and left coronary and noncoronary leaflet fusion patterns enables detection of specific aortic regions susceptible to dysfunction and the eventual development of disease. Specifically, RL and RN fusion patterns are more likely to develop into these aortic disease states. The blood flow information associated with RL fusion causes dilation of the mid-ascending aorta, while RN fusion is associated with dilation in the root, distal ascending aorta and transverse arch. BAV helical and high velocity outflow patterns are consistent with aortic dilation hemodynamics seen in those with tricuspid aortic valves. However, it is the increase and variance in WSS and flow displacement in BAV that demonstrate the importance of aortic leaflet morphology. Flow displacement measurements taken from 4D MRI may be best for detecting irregularities in hemodynamics. Displacement measurements were highly sensitive and distinguishable between different valve morphologies. Hemodynamic measurements from 4D MRI in patients with BAV are advantageous in determining the timing and location of repair surgery to the aorta in aortopathy states.

Most patients with bicuspid aortic valve whose valve becomes dysfunctional will need careful follow-up and potentially valve replacement at some point in life. Regular EchoCG and MRI may be performed. If the valve is normally functioning or minimally dysfunctional, average lifespan is similar to that of those without the anomaly.

== Diagnosis ==
Heart bicuspid aortic valve diagram

A bicuspid aortic valve can be associated with a heart murmur located at the right second intercostal space. Often there will be differences in blood pressures between upper and lower extremities. The diagnosis can be assisted with echocardiography or magnetic resonance imaging (MRI). Four-dimensional magnetic resonance imaging (4D MRI) is a technique that defines blood flow characteristics and patterns throughout the vessels, across valves, and in compartments of the heart. Four-dimensional imaging enables accurate visualizations of blood flow patterns in a three-dimensional (3D) spatial volume, as well as in a fourth temporal dimension. Current 4D MRI systems produces high-resolution images of blood flow in just a single scan session.

=== Classification ===
Bicuspid aortic valves may assume three different types of configuration:

1. "Real" bicuspid valves with two symmetric leaflets
2. A tricuspid architecture with a fusion of two leaflets
3. A tricuspid architecture with a fusion of three leaflets

== Treatment ==
Complications stemming from structural heart issues are most often treated through surgical intervention, which could include aortic valve replacement, or balloon valvuloplasty.

== Prognosis ==
BAV leads to significant complications in over one-third of affected individuals. Notable complications of BAV include narrowing of the aortic valve opening, backward blood flow at the aortic valve, dilation of the ascending aorta, and infection of the heart valve.

If aortic regurgitation and dilation of the ascending aorta are noted in someone, they should undergo yearly surveillance with transthoracic echocardiograms if the aortic root measures 4.5 centimeters or greater in diameter.

== Epidemiology ==
Bicuspid aortic valves are the most common cardiac valvular anomaly, occurring in 1–2% of the general population. It is twice as common in males as in females.

Bicuspid aortic valve is a heritable condition, with a demonstrated association with mutations in the NOTCH1 gene. Its heritability ($h^2$) is as high as 89%. Both familial clustering and isolated valve defects have been documented. Recent studies suggest that BAV is an autosomal dominant condition with incomplete penetrance. Other congenital heart defects are associated with bicuspid aortic valve at various frequencies, including coarctation of the aorta.

Bicuspid aortic valve abnormality is also the most observed cardiac defect in Turner syndrome.
