= Kim Solez =

American pathologist (born 1946)

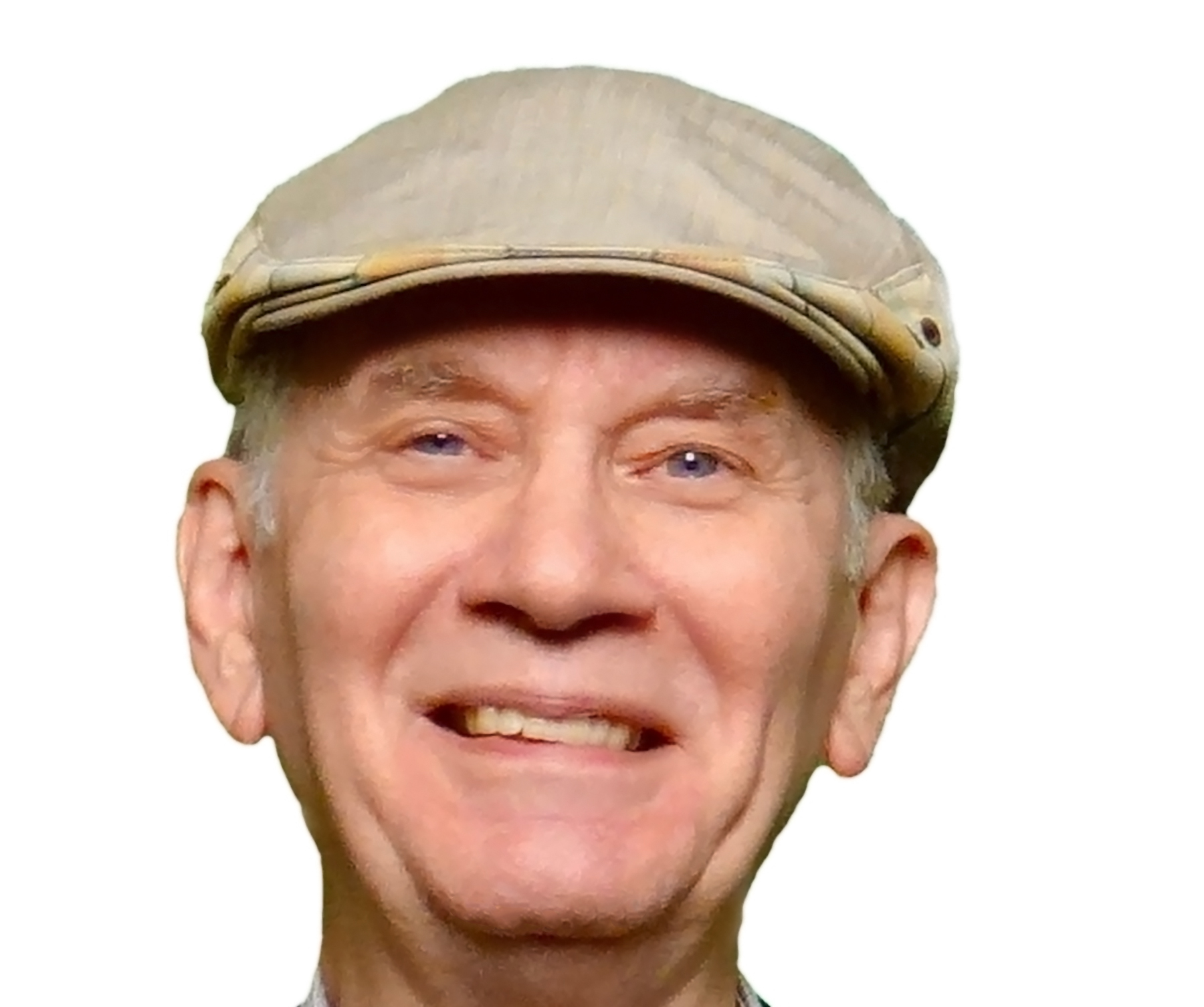
- Solez in 2019
- Born: June 20, 1946 (age 79); Washington, D.C.
- Education: Johns Hopkins School of Medicine (1977); University of Rochester School of Medicine and Dentistry(M.D.,1972); Oberlin College (B.A. 1968)
- Known for: Banff Classification
- Medical career
- Sub-specialties: Renal pathology

Kim Solez (born 1946) is an American pathologist and co-founder of the Banff Classification, the first standardized international classification for renal allograft biopsies. He is also the founder of the Banff Foundation for Allograft Pathology.

== Background ==
Kim Solez obtained his M.D. with AOA honours from the University of Rochester School of Medicine and Dentistry, and trained in pathology at Johns Hopkins Medical Institutions in Baltimore, Maryland where he was mentored in renal pathology by Robert Heptinstall. He joined the faculty at Johns Hopkins and in 1987 became chairman of the Department of Pathology at the University of Alberta in Edmonton, Canada. In 1991, he established the Banff Classification, the first standardized, international classification for renal allograft biopsies, with Johns Hopkins pathologist Lorraine Racusen. The Banff Classification, updated in regular intervals, continues to "set standards worldwide for how biopsies from kidney and other solid organ transplants are interpreted". As chair of the International Society of Nephrology (ISN) Commission on Acute Renal Failure, from 1989 to 1997, Solez started the ISN Disaster Relief Task Force, a worldwide network of experts working closely with Médecins Sans Frontières "to provide essential medical care to people in the wake of natural disasters". In 1997, Solez worked to end the mysterious Haitian diethylene glycol poisonings, where the contaminated production of cough syrup lead to acute renal failure in 109 Haitian children. Solez was included in the 60 Minutes coverage of the investigation. In 2002, Solez founded Leonard Cohen Night, an Edmonton-local artistic event celebrating the work of Canadian singer-songwriter Leonard Cohen, and in 2008 co-organized the Leonard Cohen International Festival. In 2010, Solez completed the Singularity University Executive Course, and in 2011 pioneered a unique graduate level medical course Technology and the Future of Medicine at the University of Alberta. Solez has led the University of Alberta's involvement in the creation and further development of a unique medical school in Nepal devoted to rural health Patan Academy of Health Sciences. Solez continues work as a Pathologist at the University of Alberta, as well as Professor and Director of Experimental Pathology in the Department of Laboratory Medicine and Pathology.

== Career ==
- Associate Professor of Pathology and Medicine, The Johns Hopkins University School of Medicine (1983–87)
- Professor and Chairman, Department of Pathology, University of Alberta (1987–92)
- Director, Anatomical Pathology, University of Alberta Hospital (1987–92)
- Pathologist, University of Alberta Hospital (1987-).
- Professor, Director - Experimental Pathology, Department of Laboratory Medicine and Pathology, University of Alberta (1992-)

== Organizations ==
- Banff Foundation for Allograft Pathology

== Publications ==
- Over 230 journal articles.
- Acute Renal Failure: Correlations Between Morphology and Function (1984)
- Kidney Transplant Rejection - Diagnosis and Treatment (1986)
- International Review of Experimental Pathology (multiple editions)
- Acute Renal Failure: Diagnosis, Treatment, Prevention (1991)
- Organ Transplantation: Long-Term Results (1992)
- Solid Organ Transplant Rejection: Mechanisms, Pathology, and Diagnosis (1996)

== Awards ==
- National Kidney Foundation Fellowship, 1976-77.
- National Kidney Foundation International Distinguished Medal, 2009.
- University of Alberta Faculty of Medicine and Dentistry Tier 1 Clinical Mentoring Award, 2016.
- Catalan Society for Transplantation Gold Medal, 2017
- American Society of Transplantation Fellowship, FAST designation 2020.
