= Kidney transplantation =

Medical procedure

Kidney Transplantation
- Other names: Renal transplantation
- Specialty: Nephrology, transplantology
- ICD-10-PCS: OTY
- ICD-9-CM: 55.6
- MeSH: D016030
- OPS-301 code: 5-555
- MedlinePlus: 003005

Kidney transplant or renal transplant is the organ transplant of a kidney into a patient with end-stage kidney disease (ESRD). Kidney transplant is typically classified as deceased-donor (formerly known as cadaveric) or living-donor transplantation depending on the source of the donor organ. Living-donor kidney transplants are further characterized as genetically related (living-related) or non-related (living-unrelated) transplants, depending on whether a biological relationship exists between the donor and recipient. The first successful kidney transplant was performed in 1954 by a team including Joseph Murray, the recipient's surgeon, and Hartwell Harrison, surgeon for the donor. Murray was awarded a Nobel Prize in Physiology or Medicine in 1990 for this and other work. In 2018, an estimated 95,479 kidney transplants were performed worldwide, 36% of which came from living donors.

Before receiving a kidney transplant, a person with ESRD must undergo a thorough medical evaluation to make sure that they are healthy enough to undergo transplant surgery. If they are deemed a good candidate, they can be placed on a waiting list to receive a kidney from a deceased donor. Once they are placed on the waiting list, they can receive a new kidney very quickly, or they may have to wait many years; in the United States, the average waiting time is three to five years. During transplant surgery, the new kidney is usually placed in the lower abdomen (belly); the person's two native kidneys are not usually taken out unless there is a medical reason to do so.

People with ESRD who receive a kidney transplant generally live longer than people with ESRD who are on dialysis and may have a better quality of life. However, kidney transplant recipients must remain on immunosuppressants (medications to suppress the immune system) for as long as the new kidney is working to prevent their body from rejecting it. This long-term immunosuppression puts them at higher risk for infections and cancer. Kidney transplant rejection can be classified as cellular rejection or antibody-mediated rejection. Antibody-mediated rejection can be classified as hyperacute, acute, or chronic, depending on how long after the transplant it occurs. It is important to regularly monitor the new kidney's function by measuring serum creatinine and other tests; these should be done at least every three months. Donor-derived cell-free DNA (dd-cfDNA) blood testing can be done to detect early rejection. If rejection is suspected, a kidney biopsy should be obtained.

== History ==
One of the earliest mentions about the possibility of a kidney transplant was by American medical researcher Simon Flexner, who declared in a reading of his paper on "Tendencies in Pathology" in the University of Chicago in 1907 that it would be possible in the then-future for diseased human organs substitution for healthy ones by surgery, including arteries, stomach, kidneys and heart.

In 1933, surgeon Yuriy Voronyi from Zhuravka, Ukraine, attempted the first human kidney transplant in Kherson, Ukraine, using a kidney removed six hours earlier from a deceased donor to be reimplanted into the thigh. He measured kidney function using a connection between the kidney and the skin. His first patient died two days later, as the graft was incompatible with the recipient's blood group and was rejected.

It was not until 17 June 1950, when a successful transplant was performed on Ruth Tucker, a 44-year-old woman with polycystic kidney disease, by Richard Lawler at Little Company of Mary Hospital in Evergreen Park, Illinois. Although the donated kidney was rejected ten months later because no immunosuppressive therapy was available at the time, the intervening time gave Tucker's remaining kidney time to recover and she lived another five years.

Dr. John P. Merrill (left) explains the workings of a then-new machine called an artificial kidney to Richard Herrick (middle) and his brother Ronald (right). The Herrick twin brothers were the subjects of the world's first successful kidney transplant, Ronald being the donor.

A kidney transplant between living patients was undertaken in 1952 at the Necker hospital in Paris by Jean Hamburger, although the kidney failed after three weeks. The first truly successful transplant of this kind occurred in 1954 in Boston. The Boston transplantation, performed on 23 December 1954 at Brigham Hospital, was performed by Joseph Murray, J. Hartwell Harrison, John P. Merrill, and others. The procedure was done between identical twins Ronald (the donor) and Richard Herrick (the recipient), which reduced problems of an immune reaction. For this and later work, Murray received the Nobel Prize for Medicine in 1990. Richard Herrick's death eight years after the transplant was unrelated to the transplant.

In 1955, Charles Rob, William Dempster (St Marys and Hammersmith, London) carried out the first deceased donor transplant in United Kingdom, which was unsuccessful. In July 1959, "Fred" Peter Raper (Leeds) performed the first successful (8 months) deceased donor transplant in the UK. A year later, in 1960, the first successful living kidney transplant in the UK occurred, when Michael Woodruff performed one between identical twins in Edinburgh.

In November 1994, the Sultan Qaboos University Hospital, in Oman, performed the world's youngest cadaveric kidney transplant successfully. The work took place from a newborn of 33 weeks to a 17-month-old recipient who survived for 22 years (thanks to the couple of organs transplanted into him).

Until the routine use of medication to prevent and treat acute rejection, introduced in 1964, deceased donor transplantation was not performed. The kidney was the easiest organ to transplant: tissue typing was simple; the organ was relatively easy to remove and implant; live donors could be used without difficulty; and in the event of failure, kidney dialysis was available from the 1940s. As explained in Thomas Starzl's 1992 memoir, these factors explain why Starzl's team and others began with kidney transplantation as the first type of solid organ transplantation to translate to clinical practice before attempting to move on to liver transplantation, heart transplantation, and other types.

The major barrier to organ transplantation between genetically non-identical patients lies in the recipient's immune system, which would treat a transplanted kidney as a 'non-self' and immediately or chronically reject it. Thus, having medication to suppress the immune system was essential. However, suppressing an individual's immune system places that individual at greater risk of infection and cancer (particularly skin cancer and lymphoma), in addition to the side effects of the medications.

The basis for most immunosuppressive regimens is prednisolone, a corticosteroid. Prednisolone suppresses the immune system, but its long-term use at high doses causes a multitude of side effects, including glucose intolerance and diabetes, weight gain, osteoporosis, muscle weakness, hypercholesterolemia, and cataract formation. Prednisolone alone is usually inadequate to prevent rejection of a transplanted kidney. Thus, other, non-steroid immunosuppressive agents are needed, which also allow lower doses of prednisolone. These include: azathioprine and mycophenolate, and ciclosporin and tacrolimus.

== Indications ==
The indication for kidney transplantation is end-stage renal disease (ESRD), regardless of the primary cause. This is defined as a glomerular filtration rate below 15 ml/min/1.73 m^{2}. Common diseases leading to ESRD include renovascular disease, infection, diabetes mellitus, and autoimmune conditions such as chronic glomerulonephritis and lupus; genetic causes include polycystic kidney disease, and several inborn errors of metabolism. The most common 'cause' is idiopathic (i.e., unknown).

Diabetes is the most common cause of kidney transplantation, accounting for approximately 25% of those in the United States. The majority of renal transplant recipients are on dialysis (peritoneal dialysis or hemodialysis) at the time of transplantation. However, individuals with chronic kidney disease who have a living donor available may undergo pre-emptive transplantation before dialysis is needed. If a patient is put on the waiting list for a deceased donor transplant early enough, this may also occur pre-dialysis.

== Evaluation of kidney donors and recipients ==
Both potential kidney donors and kidney recipients are carefully screened to ensure positive outcomes.

=== Contraindications for kidney recipients ===
Contraindications to receiving a kidney transplant include both cardiac and pulmonary insufficiency, as well as hepatic disease and some cancers. Concurrent tobacco use and morbid obesity are also among the indicators putting a patient at a higher risk for surgical complications.

Kidney transplant requirements vary from program to program and country to country. Many programs place age limits (e.g., the person must be under a certain age to enter the waiting list) and require that one must be in good health (aside from kidney disease). Significant cardiovascular disease, incurable terminal infectious diseases, and cancer are often transplant exclusion criteria. In addition, candidates are typically screened to determine if they will be compliant with their medications, which is essential for the survival of the transplant. People with mental illness and/or significant ongoing substance abuse issues may be excluded.

HIV was at one point considered to be a complete contraindication to transplantation. There was fear that immunosuppressing someone with a depleted immune system would result in the progression of the disease. However, some research seems to suggest that immunosuppressive drugs and antiretrovirals may work synergistically to help both HIV viral loads/CD4 cell counts and prevent active rejection.

=== Living kidney donor evaluation ===
As candidates for a significant elective surgery, potential kidney donors are carefully screened to ensure good long-term outcomes. The screening includes medical and psychosocial components. Sometimes donors can be successfully screened in a few months, but the process can take longer, especially if test results indicate additional tests are required. A total approval time of under six months has been identified as an important goal for transplant centers to avoid missed opportunities for kidney transplant (for example, that the intended recipient becomes too ill for transplant while the donor is being evaluated).

The psychosocial screening attempts to determine the presence of psychosocial problems that might complicate donation, such as a lack of social support to aid in their post-operative recovery, coercion by family members, or a lack of understanding of medical risks.

The medical screening assesses the general health and surgical risk of the donor, including conditions that might indicate complications from living with a single kidney. It also assesses whether the donor has diseases that might be transmitted to the recipient (who usually will be immunosuppressed), assesses the anatomy of the donor's kidneys, including differences in size and issues that might complicate surgery, and determines the immunological compatibility of the donor and recipient. Specific rules vary by transplant center, but key exclusion criteria often include:

- diabetes;
- uncontrolled hypertension;
- severe obesity;
- heart or lung disease;
- history of cancer;
- family history of kidney disease; and
- impaired kidney performance or proteinuria.

== Sources of kidneys ==
Since medication to prevent rejection is so effective, donors do not need to be similar to their recipients. Most donated kidneys come from deceased donors; however, the use of living donors in the United States is rising. In 2006, 47% of donated kidneys were from living donors. This varies by country: for example, only 3% of kidneys transplanted during 2006 in Spain came from living donors. In Spain, all citizens are potential organ donors in the case of their death, unless they explicitly opt out during their lifetime.

=== Living donors ===
Approximately one in three donations in the US, UK, and Israel is now from a live donor. Potential donors are carefully evaluated on medical and psychological grounds. This ensures that the donor is fit for surgery and has no disease that brings undue risk or likelihood of a poor outcome for either the donor or recipient. The psychological assessment is to ensure the donor gives informed consent and is not coerced. In countries where paying for organs is illegal, the authorities may also seek to ensure that a donation has not resulted from a financial transaction.

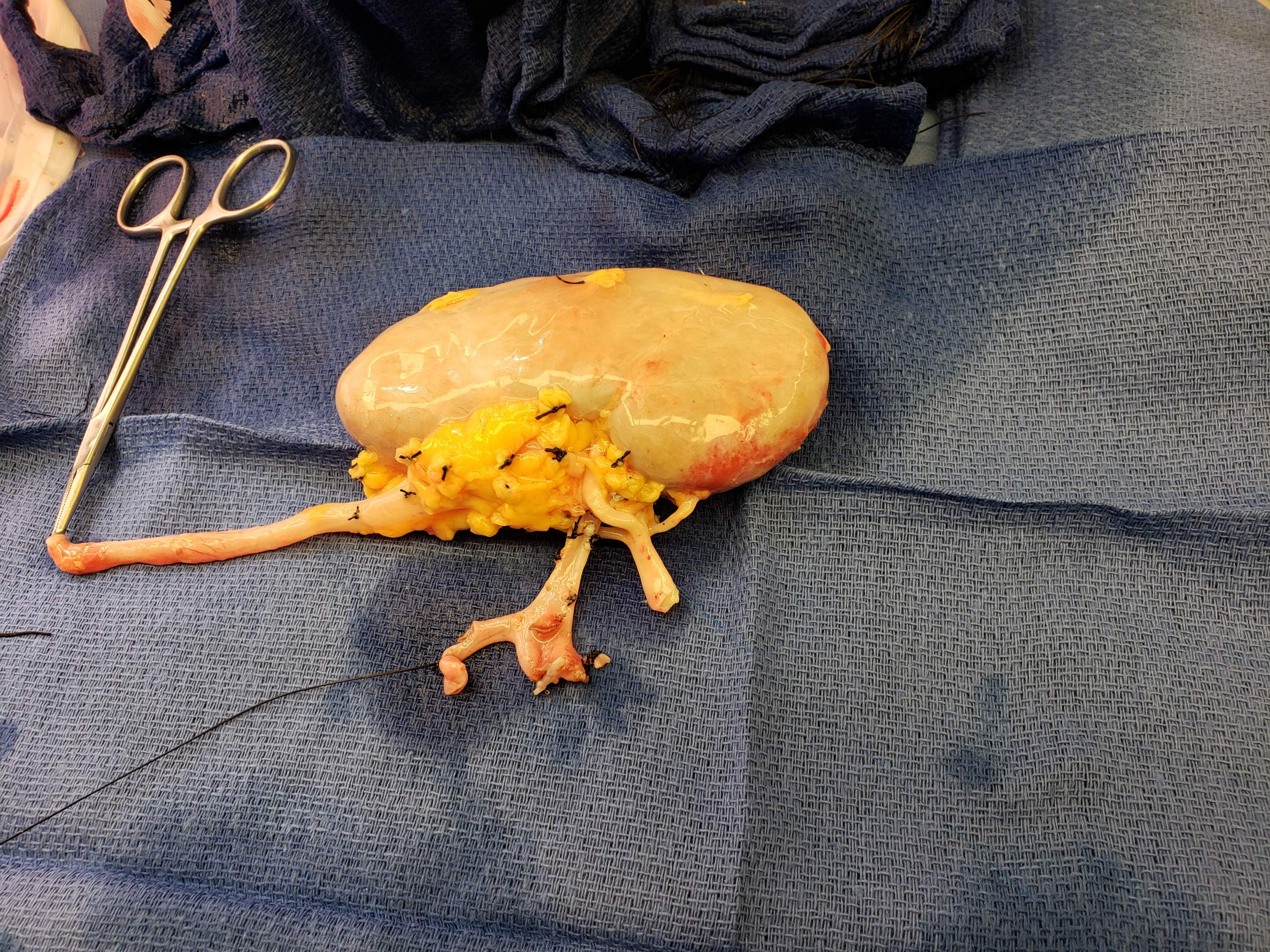
Kidney for transplant from live donor

The relationship the donor has with the recipient has evolved over the years. In the 1950s, the first successful living donor transplants were between identical twins. In the 1960s–1970s, live donors were genetically related to the recipient. However, during the 1980s–1990s, the donor pool was expanded further to emotionally related individuals (spouses, friends). Now the elasticity of the donor relationship has been stretched to include acquaintances and even strangers ('altruistic donors'). In 2009, a US transplant recipient Chris Strouth received a kidney from a donor who connected with him on Twitter, which is believed to be the first such transplant arranged entirely through social networking.

Exchanges (swaps) and chains are an approach to expand the living donor pool. In February 2012, this approach to expand the living donor pool resulted in the then-longest chain in the world involving 60 participants, organized by the National Kidney Registry. In 2014, the record for the longest chain was broken again by a swap involving 70 participants. The acceptance of altruistic donors has enabled chains of transplants to form. Kidney chains are initiated when an altruistic donor donates a kidney to a patient who has a willing but incompatible donor. The incompatible donor then "pays it forward" and passes on the generosity to another recipient who also had a willing but incompatible donor. Michael Rees from the University of Toledo developed the concept of open-ended chains. This was a variation of a concept developed at Johns Hopkins University. On 30 July 2008, an altruistic donor kidney was shipped via commercial airline from Cornell to UCLA, thus triggering a chain of transplants. The shipment of living donor kidneys, computer-matching software algorithms, and cooperation between transplant centers has enabled long-elaborate chains to be formed.

In 2004, the FDA approved the Cedars-Sinai High Dose IVIG therapy, which reduces the need for the living donor to be the same blood type (ABO compatible) or even a tissue match. The therapy reduced the incidence of the recipient's immune system rejecting the donated kidney in highly sensitized patients.

A 2009 study published in the New England Journal of Medicine found that for carefully screened kidney donors, survival and the risk of end-stage renal disease appear similar to those in the general population. However, some more recent studies suggest that the lifelong-risk of chronic kidney disease is several-fold higher in kidney donors, although the absolute risk is still very small.

A 2017 article in the New England Journal of Medicine suggests that persons with only one kidney, including those who have donated a kidney for transplantation, should avoid a high-protein diet and limit their protein intake to less than one gram per kilogram body weight per day to reduce the long-term risk of chronic kidney disease. Women who have donated a kidney have a higher risk of gestational hypertension and preeclampsia than matched nondonors with similar indicators of baseline health.

==== Surgical procedure ====
Traditionally, the donor procedure has been through a single incision of 4–7 inches (10–18 cm), but live donation is being increasingly performed by laparoscopic surgery. This reduces pain and accelerates recovery for the donor. Operative time and complications decreased significantly after a surgeon performed 150 cases. Live donor kidney grafts have higher long-term success rates than those from deceased donors. Since the increase in the use of laparoscopic surgery, the number of live donors has increased. Any advance that leads to a decrease in pain and scarring and swifter recovery has the potential to boost donor numbers. In January 2009, the first all-robotic kidney transplant was performed at Saint Barnabas Medical Center, located in Livingston, New Jersey, through a two-inch incision. In the following six months, the same team performed eight more robotic-assisted transplants.

In 2009, at Johns Hopkins Hospital in Baltimore, a healthy kidney was removed through the donor's vagina. Vaginal donations promise to speed recovery and reduce scarring. The first donor was chosen as she had previously had a hysterectomy. The extraction was performed using natural orifice transluminal endoscopic surgery, where an endoscope is inserted through an orifice, then through an internal incision, so that there is no external scar. The recent advance of single port laparoscopy, requiring only one entry point at the navel, is another advance with potential for more frequent use.

==== Organ trade ====
In the developing world, some people sell their organs illegally. Such people are often in grave poverty or are exploited by salespersons. The people who travel to make use of these kidneys are often known as 'transplant tourists'. This practice is opposed by a variety of human rights groups, including Organs Watch, a group established by medical anthropologists, which was instrumental in exposing illegal international organ-selling rings. These patients may have increased complications owing to poor infection control and lower medical and surgical standards. One surgeon has said that organ trade could be legalised in the UK to prevent such tourism, but this is not seen by the National Kidney Research Fund as the answer to a deficit in donors.

In the illegal black market, the donors may not get sufficient after-operation care, the price of a kidney may be above $160,000, middlemen take most of the money, the operation is more dangerous to both the donor and receiver, and the buyer often gets hepatitis or HIV. In the legal markets of Iran, the price of a kidney is $2,000 to $4,000.

An article by Gary Becker and Julio Elias on "Introducing Incentives in the market for Live and Cadaveric Organ Donations" said that a free market could help solve the problem of a scarcity in organ transplants. Their economic modeling was able to estimate the price for human kidneys ($15,000) and human livers ($32,000).

Jason Brennan and Peter Jaworski from Georgetown University have also argued that any moral objections to a market for organs are not inherent in the market, but rather the activity itself.

Monetary compensation for organ donors in the form of reimbursement for out-of-pocket expenses, has been legalised in 23 countries including the United States United Kingdom, Australia and Singapore.

=== Deceased donors ===
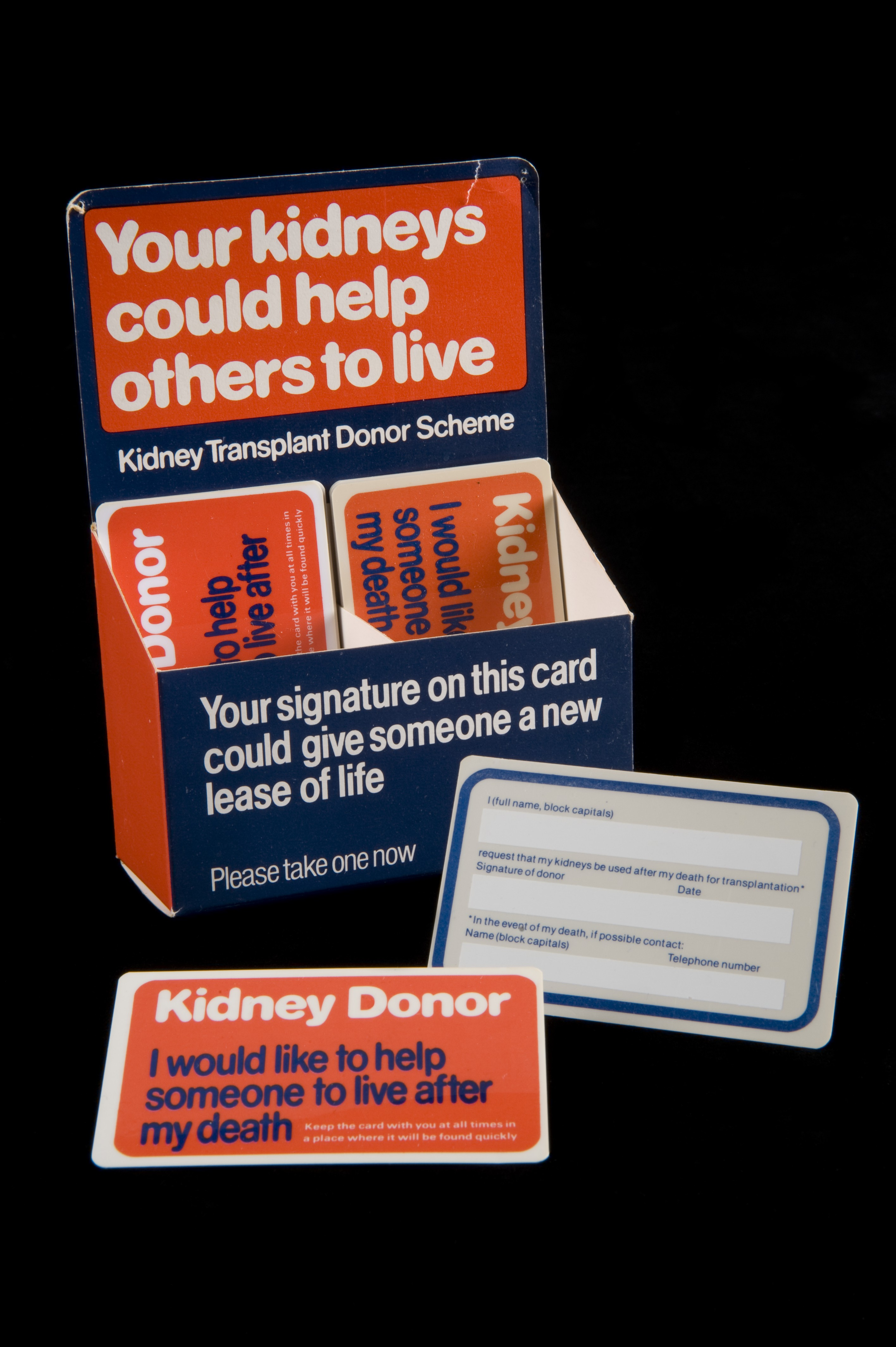
Kidney donor cards from England, 1971–1981. The cards were made to be carried by donors as evidence that they were willing to donate their kidneys should they, for example, be killed in an accident.

Deceased donors can be divided into two groups:

- Brain-dead (BD) donors
- Donation after cardiac death (DCD) donors

Although brain-dead (or 'heart beating') donors are considered medically and legally dead, the donor's heart continues to pump and maintain circulation. This makes it possible for surgeons to start operating while the organs are still being perfused (supplied blood). During the operation, the aorta will be cannulated, after which the donor's blood will be replaced by an ice-cold storage solution, such as UW (Viaspan), HTK, or Perfadex. Depending on which organs are transplanted, more than one solution may be used simultaneously. Due to the temperature of the solution, and since large amounts of cold NaCl-solution are poured over the organs for rapid cooling, the heart will stop pumping.

'Donation after Cardiac Death' donors are patients who do not meet the brain-dead criteria but, due to the unlikely chance of recovery, have elected via a living will or through family to have support withdrawn. In this procedure, treatment is discontinued (mechanical ventilation is shut off). After a time of death has been pronounced, the patient is rushed to the operating room, where the organs are recovered. The storage solution is flushed through the organs. Since the blood is no longer being circulated, coagulation must be prevented with large amounts of anticoagulation agents such as heparin. Several ethical and procedural guidelines must be followed; most importantly, the organ recovery team should not participate in the patient's care in any manner until after death has been declared.

=== Increased donors ===
Vaughan Gething, Welsh Government health minister, addresses the Kidney Research UK Annual Fellows Day, 2017.

Many governments have passed laws whereby the default is an opt-in system to increase the number of donors.

Since December 2015, Human Transplantation (Wales) Act 2013, passed by the Welsh Government, has enabled an opt-out organ donation register, the first country in the UK to do so. The legislation is 'deemed consent', whereby all citizens are considered to have no objection to becoming a donor unless they have opted out of this register.

With the approval of Epclusa in 2020, the number of donors has increased. The medication allows for the curing of Hepatitis C positive individuals, which has increased the pool of available organs.

=== Animal transplants ===
In 2022, the University of Alabama, Birmingham, announced the first peer-reviewed research outlining the successful transplant of genetically modified, clinical-grade pig kidneys into a brain-dead human individual, replacing the recipient's native kidneys. In the study, which was published in the American Journal of Transplantation, researchers tested the first human preclinical model for transplanting genetically modified pig kidneys into humans. The recipient of the study had his native kidneys removed and received two genetically modified pig kidneys in their place. The organs came from a genetically modified pig from a pathogen-free facility. In March 2024, a team of surgeons at Massachusetts General Hospital transplanted a kidney from a genetically modified pig into a 62-year-old man. Two weeks after the surgery, the doctor said the patient was well enough to be discharged.

== Compatibility ==
In general, the donor and recipient should be ABO blood group and crossmatch (human leukocyte antigen – HLA) compatible. If a potential living donor is incompatible with their recipient, the donor could be exchanged for a compatible kidney. Kidney exchange, also known as "kidney paired donation" or "chains," has recently gained popularity.

To reduce the risk of rejection during incompatible transplantation, ABO-incompatible and desensitization protocols utilizing intravenous immunoglobulin (IVIG) have been developed to reduce ABO and HLA antibodies that the recipient may have to the donor. In 2004, the FDA approved the Cedars-Sinai High Dose IVIG therapy, which reduces the need for the living donor to be the same blood type (ABO compatible) or even a tissue match. The therapy reduced the incidence of the recipient's immune system rejecting the donated kidney in highly sensitized patients.

In the 1980s, experimental protocols were developed for ABO-incompatible transplants using increased immunosuppression and plasmapheresis. Through the 1990s, these techniques were improved, and an important study of long-term outcomes in Japan was published. Now, several programs around the world are routinely performing ABO-incompatible transplants.

The level of sensitization to donor HLA antigens is determined by performing a panel reactive antibody test on the potential recipient. In the United States, up to 17% of all deceased donor kidney transplants have no HLA mismatch. However, HLA matching is a relatively minor predictor of transplant outcomes. Living non-related donors are now almost as common as living (genetically)-related donors.

== Procedure ==
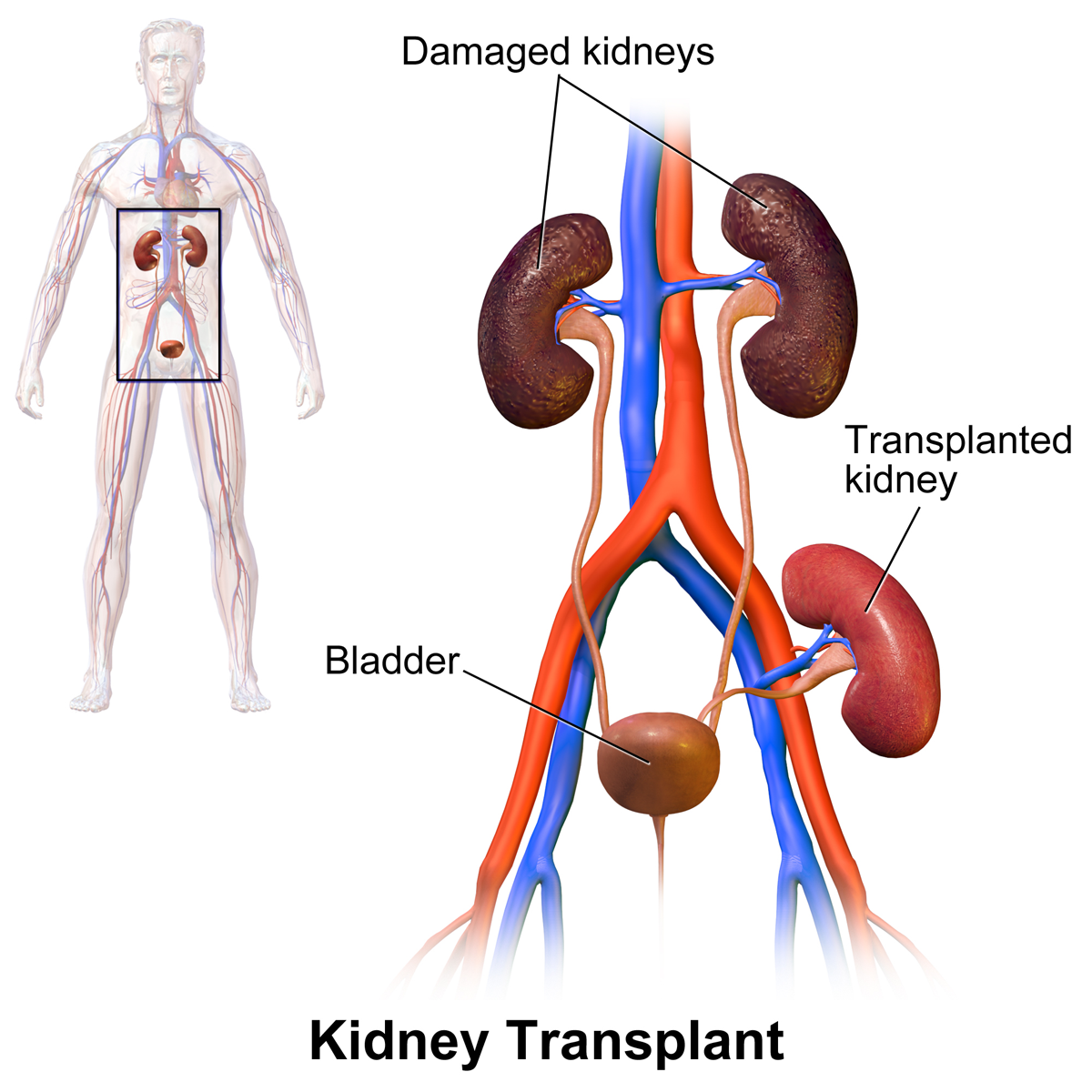
Kidney transplant

In most cases, the barely functioning existing kidneys are not removed, as removal has been shown to increase the rates of surgical morbidity. Therefore, the kidney is usually placed in a location different from the original kidney. Often, this is in the right-sided iliac fossa, so it is often necessary to use a different blood supply:

- The renal artery of the new kidney, previously branching from the abdominal aorta in the donor, is often connected to the external iliac artery in the recipient.
- The renal vein of the new kidney, previously draining to the inferior vena cava in the donor, is often connected to the external iliac vein in the recipient.

The donor ureter is anastomosed with the recipient bladder. In some cases, a ureteral stent is placed at the time of the anastomosis, with the assumption that it allows for better drainage and healing. However, using a modified Lich-Gregoir technique, Gaetano Ciancio developed a technique that no longer requires ureteral stenting, avoiding many stent-related complications.

There is disagreement in surgical textbooks regarding which side of the recipient's pelvis to use in receiving the transplant. Campbell's Urology (2002) recommends placing the donor kidney in the recipient's contralateral side (i.e., a left-sided kidney would be transplanted in the recipient's right side) to ensure the renal pelvis and ureter are anterior if future surgeries are required. In an instance where there is doubt over whether there is enough space in the recipient's pelvis for the donor's kidney, the textbook recommends using the right side because the right side has a wider choice of arteries and veins for reconstruction.

Glen's Urological Surgery (2004) recommends putting the kidney on the contralateral side in all circumstances. No reason is explicitly put forth; however, one can assume the rationale is similar to that of Campbell, i.e., to ensure that the renal pelvis and ureter are most anterior if future surgical correction becomes necessary.

Smith's Urology (2004) states that either side of the recipient's pelvis is acceptable; however, the right vessels are 'more horizontal' concerning each other and therefore easier to use in the anastomoses. It is unclear what is meant by the words 'more horizontal'.

== Kidney-pancreas transplant ==
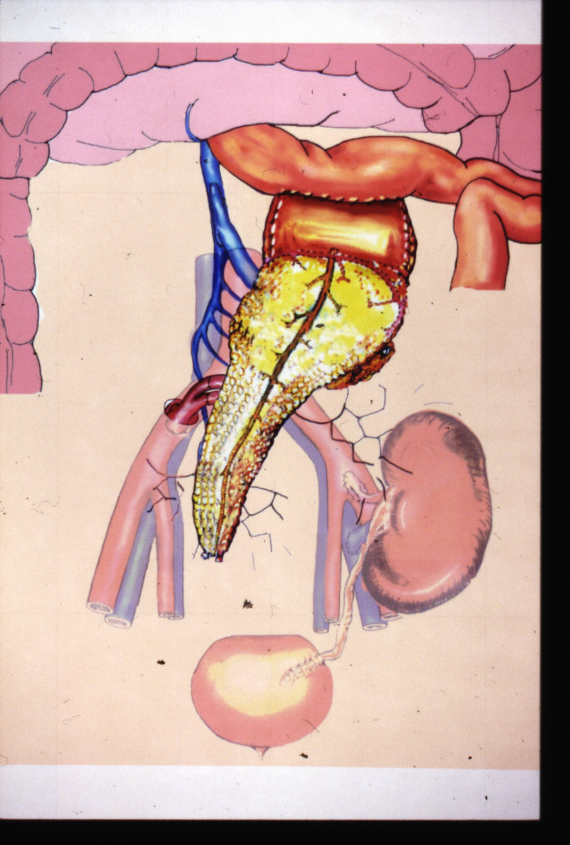
Kidney-pancreas transplant

Occasionally, the kidney is transplanted together with the pancreas. University of Minnesota surgeons Richard Lillehei and William Kelly performed the first successful simultaneous pancreas-kidney transplant in the world in 1966. This is done in patients with diabetes mellitus type 1, in whom the diabetes is due to destruction of the beta cells of the pancreas and in whom the diabetes has caused kidney failure (diabetic nephropathy). This is almost always a deceased donor transplant. Only a few living donor (partial) pancreas transplants have been done. For individuals with diabetes and kidney failure, the advantages of an earlier transplant from a living donor (if available) are far superior to the risks of continued dialysis until a combined kidney and pancreas are available from a deceased donor. A patient can either receive a living kidney followed by a donor pancreas at a later date (PAK, or pancreas-after-kidney) or a combined kidney-pancreas from a donor (SKP, simultaneous kidney-pancreas).

Transplanting just the islet cells from the pancreas is still in the experimental stage, but shows promise. This involves taking a deceased donor pancreas, breaking it down, and extracting the islet cells that make insulin. The cells are then injected through a catheter into the recipient, and they generally lodge in the liver. The recipient still needs to take immunosuppressants to avoid rejection, but no surgery is required. Most people need two or three such injections, and many are not completely insulin-free.

== Post-operation ==
The transplant surgery takes about three hours. The donor kidney will be placed in the lower abdomen and its blood vessels connected to arteries and veins in the recipient's body. When this is complete, blood will be allowed to flow through the kidney again. The final step is connecting the ureter from the donor kidney to the bladder. In most cases, the kidneys will soon start producing urine.

Depending on its quality, the new kidney usually begins functioning immediately. Living donor kidneys normally require 3–5 days to reach normal functioning levels, while cadaveric donations stretch that interval to 7–15 days. Hospital stay is typically for 4–10 days. If complications arise, additional medications (diuretics) may be administered to help the kidneys produce urine.

Immunosuppressant drugs are used to suppress the immune system from rejecting the donor kidney. These medicines must be taken for the rest of the recipient's life. The most common medication regimen today is a mixture of tacrolimus, mycophenolate, and prednisolone. Some recipients may instead take ciclosporin, sirolimus, or azathioprine. The risk of early rejection of the transplanted kidney is increased if corticosteroids are avoided or withdrawn after the transplantation. Ciclosporin, considered a breakthrough immunosuppressive when first discovered in the 1980s, ironically causes nephrotoxicity and can result in iatrogenic damage to the newly transplanted kidney. Tacrolimus, which is a similar drug, also causes nephrotoxicity. Blood levels of both must be monitored closely and if the recipient seems to have declining kidney function or proteinuria, a kidney transplant biopsy may be necessary to determine whether this is due to rejection or ciclosporin or tacrolimus intoxication.

=== Imaging ===
Postoperatively, kidneys are periodically assessed by ultrasound to assess for the imaging and physiologic changes that accompany transplant rejection. Imaging also allows evaluation of supportive structures such as the anastomosed transplant artery, vein, and ureter, to ensure they are stable in appearance.

The major sonographic scale in quantitative ultrasound assessment is with a multipoint assessment of the resistive index (RI), beginning at the main renal artery and vein and ending at the arcuate vessels. It is calculated as follows:

RI = (peak systolic velocity – end diastolic velocity ) / peak systolic velocity

The normal value is ≈ 0.60, with 0.70 being the upper limit of normal.

Post-transplantation radioisotope renography can be used for the diagnosis of vascular and urological complications. Also, early post-transplantation renography is used for the assessment of delayed graft function.

=== Diet ===
Kidney transplant recipients are discouraged from consuming grapefruit, pomegranate, and green tea products. These food products are known to interact with the transplant medications, specifically tacrolimus, cyclosporin, and sirolimus; the blood levels of these drugs may be increased, potentially leading to an overdose.

== Complications ==
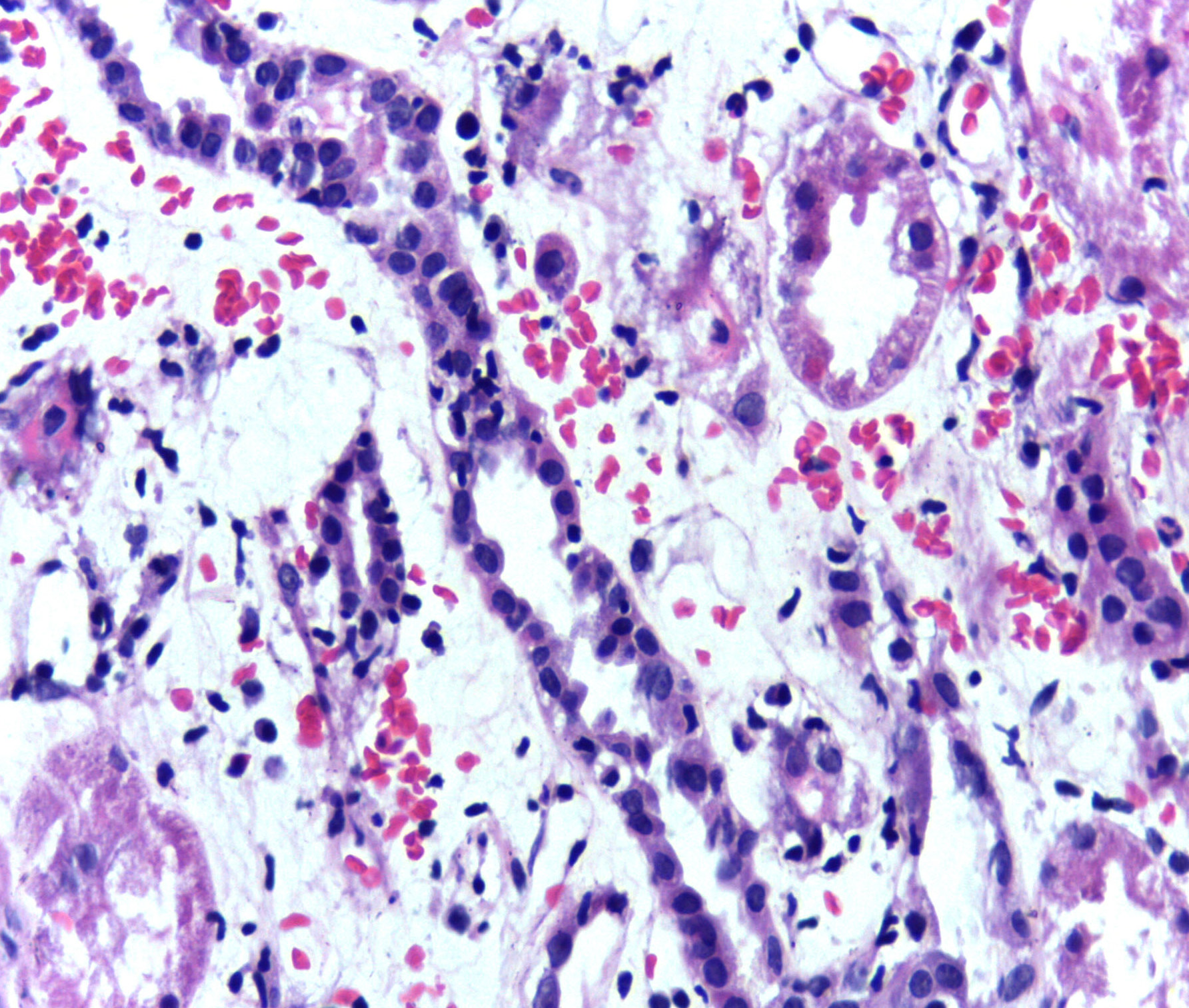
Presence of lymphocytes within the tubular epithelium, attesting to acute cellular rejection of a renal graft. Biopsy sample.

Problems after a transplant may include:

- Post-operative complications, such as bleeding, infection, vascular thrombosis and urinary complications
- Transplant rejection (hyperacute, acute or chronic)
- Infections and sepsis due to the immunosuppressant drugs that are required to decrease risk of rejection (e.g., Tuberculosis, Cytomegalovirus colitis)
- Post-transplant lymphoproliferative disorder (a form of lymphoma due to the immune suppressants). This occurs in about 2% of patients, occurring especially in the first two years post-transplant
- Skin tumours
- Imbalances in electrolytes, including calcium and phosphate, which can lead to bone problems
- Proteinuria
- Hypertension
- Recurrence of the original cause of kidney failure
- Other side effects of medications including gastrointestinal inflammation and ulceration of the stomach and esophagus, hirsutism (excessive hair growth in a male-pattern distribution) with ciclosporin, hair loss with tacrolimus, obesity, acne, diabetes mellitus type 2, hypercholesterolemia, and osteoporosis.

Alloimmune injury and recurrent glomerulonephritis are major causes of transplant failure. Within 1 year post-transplant, the majority of transplant losses are due to technical issues with the transplant or vascular complications (41% of losses), with acute rejection and glomerulonephritis being less common causes at 17% and 3%, respectively. Later causes of transplant failure, 1 year or greater after transplantation, include chronic rejection (63% of losses) and glomerulonephritis (6%).

Infections due to the immunosuppressant drugs used in people with kidney transplants most commonly occur in mucocutaneous areas (41%), the urinary tract (17%), and the respiratory tract (14%). The most common infective agents are bacterial (46%), viral (41%), fungal (13%), and protozoan (1%). Of the viral illnesses, the most common agents are human cytomegalovirus (31.5%), herpes simplex (23.4%), and herpes zoster (23.4%). Cytomegalovirus (CMV) is the most common opportunistic infection that may occur after a kidney and other solid organ transplants and is a risk factor for graft failure or acute rejection. BK virus is now being increasingly recognised as a transplant risk factor which may lead to kidney disease or transplant failure if untreated. Infection is the cause of death in about one third of people with renal transplants, and pneumonias account for 50% of the patient deaths from infection.

Delayed graft function is defined as the need for hemodialysis within 1 week of kidney transplant and is the result of excessive perfusion-related injury after transplant. Delayed graft function occurs in approximately 25% of recipients of kidneys from deceased donors. Delayed graft function leads to graft fibrosis and inflammation, and is a risk factor for graft failure in the future. Hypothermic pulsatile machine perfusion; using a machine to perfuse donor kidneys ex vivo with cold solution, rather than static cold storage, is associated with a lower incidence of delayed graft function. Deceased donor kidneys with higher kidney donor profile index (KDPI) scores (a score used to determine suitability of donor kidneys based on factors such as age of donor, cause of death, kidney function at time of death, history of diabetes or hypertension, etc.)(with higher scores indicating lower suitability) are associated with an increased risk of delayed graft function.

Acute rejection is another possible complication of kidney transplantation; it is graded according to the Banff Classification, which incorporates various serologic, molecular, and histologic markers to determine the severity of the rejection. Acute rejection can be classified as T-cell-mediated, antibody-mediated, or both (mixed rejection). Common causes of acute rejection include inadequate immunosuppression treatment or non-adherence with the immunosuppressive regimen. Clinical acute rejection (seen in approximately 10-15% of kidney transplants within the first year of transplantation) presents as kidney rejection with associated kidney dysfunction. Subclinical rejection (seen in approximately 5-15% of kidney transplants within the first year of transplantation) presents as rejection incidentally seen on biopsy but with normal kidney function. Acute rejection with onset 3 months or later after transplantation is associated with a worse prognosis. Acute rejection with onset less than 1 year after transplantation is usually T cell mediated, whereas onset greater than 1 year after transplantation is associated with a mixed T cell and antibody-mediated inflammation.

The mortality rate due to COVID-19 in kidney transplant recipients is 13-32%, which is significantly higher than that of the general population. This is thought to be due to immunosuppression status and medical co-morbidities in transplant recipients. COVID-19 vaccination with booster doses is recommended for all kidney transplant recipients.

Postoperative bleeding following kidney transplant as seen on ultrasound

Postoperative bleeding following kidney transplant as seen on ultrasound

Postoperative bleeding following kidney transplant as seen on ultrasound

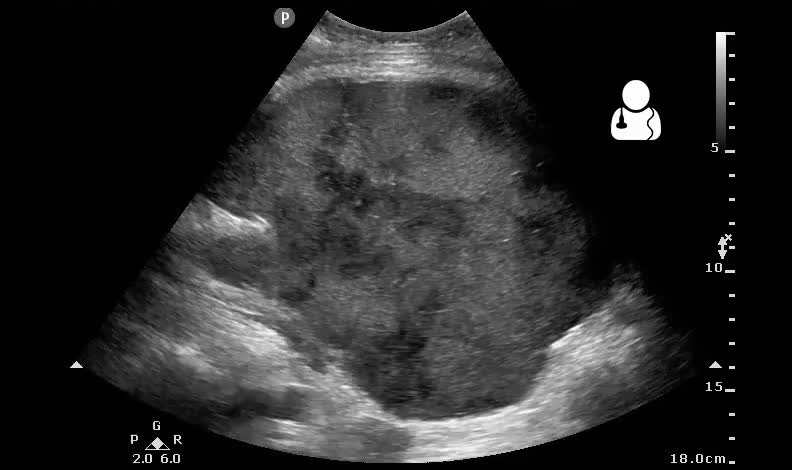
Postoperative bleeding following kidney transplant as seen on ultrasound

== Prognosis ==
Kidney transplantation is a life-extending procedure. The typical patient will live 10 to 15 years longer with a kidney transplant than if kept on dialysis. The increase in longevity is greater for younger patients, but even 75-year-old recipients (the oldest group for which there is data) gain an average four more years of life. Graft and patient survival after transplantation have also improved over time, with 10-year graft survival rates for deceased donor transplants increasing from 42.3% in 1996–1999 to 53.6% in 2008–2011, and 10-year patient survival rates increasing from 60.5% in 1996–1999 to 66.9% in 2008–2011. There is a survival benefit among recipients of kidney transplant (both living or dead recipients) as compared to those on long term dialysis without a kidney transplant, including in those with co-morbidities such as type 2 diabetes, advanced age, obesity or those with HLA mismatches. People generally have more energy, a less-restricted diet, and fewer complications with a kidney transplant than if they stay on conventional dialysis.

Some studies seem to suggest that the longer a patient is on dialysis before the transplant, the less time the kidney will last. It is unclear why this occurs, but it underscores the need for rapid referral to a transplant program. A recent study also suggests that the muscle wasting and frailty that occur during prolonged dialysis hurts a patient's physical functioning post transplantation. Ideally, a kidney transplant should be pre-emptive, i.e., take place before the patient begins dialysis. The reason why kidneys fail over time after transplantation has been elucidated in recent years. Apart from the recurrence of the original kidney disease, rejection (mainly antibody-mediated rejection) and progressive scarring (multifactorial) also play a decisive role. Avoiding rejection by strict medication adherence is of utmost importance to avoid failure of the kidney transplant.

At least four professional athletes have made a comeback to their sport after receiving a transplant: New Zealand rugby union player Jonah Lomu, German-Croatian soccer player Ivan Klasnić, and NBA basketballers Sean Elliott and Alonzo Mourning.

For live kidney donors, prognostic studies are potentially confounded a selection bias wherein kidney donors are selected among people who are healthier than the general population, but when matched to a corresponding healthy control group, there appears to be no difference in overall long-term mortality rates among kidney donors.

== Statistics ==
Statistics by country, year, and donor type
Country	Year	Cadaveric donor	Living donor	Total transplants
Australia	2020	704	182	886
Canada	2020	1,063	396	1,459
France	2003	1,991	136	2,127
Italy	2003	1,489	135	1,624
Japan	2010	208	1276	1,484
Spain	2003	1,991	60	2,051
United Kingdom	April 2020 to March 2021	1,836	422	2,258
United States	2020	17,583	5,234	22,817

In addition to nationality, transplantation rates differ based on race, sex, and income. A study done with patients beginning long-term dialysis showed that the socio-demographic barriers to renal transplantation are relevant even before patients are on the transplant list. For example, different socio-demographic groups express different interest and complete pre-transplant workup at different rates. Previous efforts to create fair transplantation policies have focused on patients currently on the transplantation waiting list.

== In the U.S. health system ==
Transplant recipients must take immunosuppressive anti-rejection drugs for as long as the transplanted kidney functions. The routine immunosuppressives are tacrolimus (Prograf), mycophenolate (Cellcept), and prednisolone; these drugs cost US$1,500 per month. In 1999, the United States Congress passed a law that restricts Medicare from paying for more than three years for these drugs unless the patient is otherwise Medicare-eligible. Transplant programs may not transplant a patient unless the patient has a reasonable plan to pay for medication after Medicare coverage expires; however, patients are rarely turned down for financial reasons alone. Half of end-stage renal disease patients only have Medicare coverage. This provision was repealed in December 2020; the repeal will come into effect on January 1, 2023. People who were on Medicare, or who had applied for Medicare at the time of their procedure, will have lifetime coverage of post-transplant drugs.

The United Network for Organ Sharing, which oversees the organ transplants in the United States, allows transplant candidates to register at two or more transplant centers, a practice known as 'multiple listing'. The practice has been shown to be effective in mitigating the dramatic geographic disparity in the waiting time for organ transplants, particularly for patients residing in high-demand regions such as Boston. The practice of multiple-listing has also been endorsed by medical practitioners.

== Notable recipients ==
See also Category:Kidney transplant recipients and List of organ transplant donors and recipients.

- David Ayres (born 1977), Canadian hockey player, transplant in 2004
- Elke Büdenbender (born 1962), spouse of the president of Germany, transplant in August 2010
- Steven Cojocaru (born 1970), Canadian fashion critic, transplants in ???? and 2005
- Andy Cole (born 1971), English footballer, transplant in April 2017
- Natalie Cole (1950–2015), American singer, transplant in 2009 (survival: 6 years)
- Gary Coleman (1968–2010), American actor, first transplant <5 years old, second transplant at 14 years old (c. 1981)
- Lucy Davis (born 1973), English actress, transplant in 1997
- Kenny Easley (born 1959), American football player, transplant in 1990
- Aron Eisenberg (1969–2019), American actor, transplants in 1986 and 2015 (survival 23 and 4 years)
- Sean Elliott (born 1968), American basketball player, transplant in 1999
- Selena Gomez (born 1992), American singer, songwriter, and actress, transplant in 2017
- Jennifer Harman (born 1964), American poker player, transplants in ???? and 2004
- Ken Howard (born 1932), English artist, transplant in 2000
- Sarah Hyland (born 1990), American actress, transplant in 2012
- Elliot F. Kaye, American lawyer, chairman of the U.S. Consumer Product Safety Commission, transplant in 2022
- Ivan Klasnić (born 1980), Croatian footballer, transplant in 2007
- Jimmy Little (1937–2012), Australian musician and actor, transplant in 2004 (survival: 8 years)
- Jonah Lomu (1975–2015), New Zealand rugby player, transplant in 2004 (survival: 11 years)
- George Lopez (born 1961), American comedian and actor, transplant in 2005
- Tracy Morgan (born 1968), American comedian and actor, transplant in 2010
- Candida Moss (born 1978), English public intellectual and Edward Cadbury Professor of Theology, transplant in 2007
- Alonzo Mourning (born 1970), American basketball player, transplant in 2003
- Kerry Packer (1937–2005), Australian businessman, transplant in 2000 (survival: 5 years)
- Charles Perkins (1936–2000), Australian footballer and activist, transplant in 1972 (survival: 28 years)
- Billy Preston (1946–2006), American musician, transplant in 2002 (survival: 4 years)
- Neil Simon (1927–2018), American playwright, transplant in 2004 (survival: 14 years)
- Ron Springs (1956–2011), American football player, transplant in 2007 (survival: 4 years)
- Tomomi "Jumbo" Tsuruta (1951–2000), Japanese professional wrestler, transplant in 2000 (survival: 1 month)

== See also ==
- Artificial kidney
- Gurgaon kidney scandal
- Jesus Christians – an Australian religious group, many of whose members have donated a kidney to a stranger
- Liver transplantation

== Bibliography ==
- Brook, Nicholas R.; Nicholson, Michael L. (2003). "Kidney transplantation from non heart-beating donors". Surgeon. 1 (6): 311–322. doi:10.1016/S1479-666X(03)80065-3. PMID 15570790.
- Danovitch, Gabriel M.; Delmonico, Francis L. (2008). "The prohibition of kidney sales and organ markets should remain". Current Opinion in Organ Transplantation. 13 (4): 386–394. doi:10.1097/MOT.0b013e3283097476. PMID 18685334.
- El-Agroudy, Amgad E.; El-Husseini, Amr A.; El-Sayed, Moharam; Ghoneim, Mohamed A. (2003). "Preventing Bone Loss in Renal Transplant Recipients with Vitamin D". Journal of the American Society of Nephrology. 14 (11): 2975–2979. doi:10.1097/01.ASN.0000093255.56474.B4. PMID 14569109.
- El-Agroudy, Amgad E.; Sabry, Alaa A.; Wafa, Ehab W.; Neamatalla, Ahmed H.; Ismail, Amani M.; Mohsen, Tarek; Khalil, Abd Allah; Shokeir, Ahmed A.; Ghoneim, Mohamed A. (2007). "Long-term follow-up of living kidney donors: a longitudinal study". BJU International. 100 (6): 1351–1355. doi:10.1111/j.1464-410X.2007.07054.x. ISSN 1464-4096. PMID 17941927. S2CID 32904086.
- Grens, Kerry (9 April 2012). "Living kidney donations favor some patient groups: study". Reuters.
- Gore John L, et al. (2012). "The Socioeconomic Status of Donors and Recipients of Living Unrelated Renal Transplants in the United States". The Journal of Urology. 187 (5): 1760–1765. doi:10.1016/j.juro.2011.12.112. PMID 22425125.
