= Cardioplegia =

Intentional and temporary cessation of cardiac activity, primarily for cardiac surgery

- Specialty: Cardiac surgery
- ICD-9-CM: 39.63
- MeSH: D006324

Cardioplegia is a solution given to the heart during cardiac surgery, to minimize the damage caused by myocardial ischemia while the heart is paused.

== Overview ==
The word cardioplegia combines the Greek cardio meaning the "heart", and plegia "paralysis". Technically, this means arresting or stopping the heart so that surgical procedures can be done in a still and bloodless field. Most commonly, however, the word cardioplegia refers to the solution used to bring about asystole of the heart, or heart paralysis. One of the first physicians to use the term cardioplegia was Dr. Lam in 1957. However his work on the myocardial protection was preceded serendipitously by Sydney Ringer in the late 1800s. At that time Ringer and colleagues noticed that tap water had the ability to increase contractility of the heart, likely due to its high calcium content. Sydney Ringer also commented on the importance of potassium ion concentration on depressing intrinsic heart rhythm. Through a series of experiments performed on frog and canine hearts, reversible arrest was achieved with potassium ions with the consequence of ventricular fibrillation and observed myocardial necrosis. These early experiments started nearly 50 years of work that has led to variety of perfusion strategies available today.

The main goals of hypothermic cardioplegia are:

1. Immediate and sustained electromechanical quiescence
2. Rapid and sustained homogeneous myocardial cooling
3. Maintenance of therapeutic additives in effective concentrations
4. Periodic washout of metabolic inhibitors

The most common procedure for accomplishing asystole is infusing cold cardioplegic solution into the coronary circulation. This process protects the myocardium, or heart muscle, from damage during the period of ischemia.

To achieve this, the patient is first placed on cardiopulmonary bypass. The Cardioplegia Delivery system is operated and run by a Perfusionist. This device, otherwise known as the heart-lung machine, takes over the functions of gas exchange by the lung and blood circulation by the heart. Subsequently, the heart is isolated from the rest of the blood circulation by means of an occlusive cross-clamp placed on the ascending aorta proximal to the innominate artery. During this period of heart isolation, the heart is not receiving any blood flow, thus no oxygen for metabolism. As the cardioplegia solution distributes to the entire myocardium, the electrocardiogram (ECG) will change and eventually asystole will ensue. Cardioplegia lowers the metabolic rate of the heart muscle, thereby preventing cell death during the ischemic period of time.

== Physiology ==
Cardioplegic solution is the means by which the ischemic myocardium is protected from cell death. This is achieved by reducing myocardial metabolism through a reduction in cardiac work load and by the use of hypothermia.

Chemically, the high potassium concentration present in most cardioplegic solutions decreases the membrane resting potential of cardiac cells. The normal resting potential of ventricular myocytes is about -90 mV. When extracellular cardioplegia displaces blood surrounding myocytes, the membrane voltage becomes less negative and the cell depolarizes more readily. The depolarization causes contraction, intracellular calcium is sequestered by the sarcoplasmic reticulum via ATP-dependent Ca^{2+} pumps, and the cell relaxes (diastole). However, the high potassium concentration of the cardioplegia extracellular prevents repolarization. The resting potential on ventricular myocardium is about −84 mV at an extracellular K^{+} concentration of 5.4 mmol/L. Raising the K^{+} concentration to 16.2 mmol/L raises the resting potential to −60 mV, a level at which muscle fibers are inexcitable to ordinary stimuli. When the resting potential approaches −50 mV, sodium channels are inactivated, resulting in a diastolic arrest of cardiac activity. Membrane inactivation gates, or h Na^{+} gates, are voltage dependent. The less negative the membrane voltage, the more h gates that tend to close. If partial depolarization is produced by a gradual process such as elevating the level of extracellular K^{+}, then the gates have ample time to close and thereby inactivate some of the Na^{+} channels. When the cell is partially depolarized, many of the Na^{+} channels are already inactivated, and only a fraction of these channels is available to conduct the inward Na^{+} current during phase 0 depolarization.

The use of two other cations, Na^{+} and Ca^{2+}, also can be used to arrest the heart. By removing extracellular Na^{+} from perfusate, the heart will not beat because the action potential is dependent upon extracellular Na^{+} ions. However, the removal of Na^{+} does not alter the resting membrane potential of the cell. Likewise, removal of extracellular Ca^{2+} results in a decreased contractile force, and eventual arrest in diastole. An example of a low [K^{+}] low [Na^{+}] solution is histidine-tryptophan-ketoglutarate. Conversely, increasing extracellular Ca^{2+} concentration enhances contractile force. Elevating Ca^{2+} concentration to a high enough level results in cardiac arrest in systole. This unfortunate irreversible event is referred to as "stone-heart" or rigor.

Hypothermia is the other key component of most cardioplegic strategies. It is employed as another means to further lower myocardial metabolism during periods of ischemia. The Van 't Hoff equation allows calculation that oxygen consumption will drop by 50% for every 10 °C reduction in temperature. This Q_{10} effect combined with a chemical cardiac arrest can reduce myocardial oxygen consumption (MVO_{2}) by 97%.

Cold cardioplegia is given into the heart through the aortic root. Blood supply to the heart arises from the aortic root through coronary arteries. Cardioplegia in diastole ensures that the heart does not use up the valuable energy stores (adenosine triphosphate). Blood is commonly added to this solution in varying amounts from 0 to 100%. Blood acts a buffer and also supplies nutrients to the heart during ischemia.

Once the procedure on the heart vessels (coronary artery bypass grafting) or inside the heart such as valve replacement or correction of congenital heart defect, etc. is over, the cross-clamp is removed and the isolation of the heart is terminated, so normal blood supply to the heart is restored and the heart starts beating again.

The cold fluid (usually at 4 °C) ensures that the heart cools down to a temperature of around 15–20 °C, thus slowing down the metabolism of the heart and thereby preventing damage to the heart muscle. This is further augmented by the cardioplegia component which is high in potassium.

When solution is introduced into the aortic root (with an aortic cross-clamp on the distal aorta to limit systemic circulation), this is called antegrade cardioplegia. When introduced into the coronary sinus, it is called retrograde cardioplegia.

Whilst there are several cardioplegic solutions commercially available; there are no clear advantages of one cardioplegic solution over another. Some cardioplegias, such as del Nido or Histidine-Tryptophan-Ketoglutamate solutions, offer an advantage over blood and other crystalloid cardioplegia as they only require one administration during short cardiac surgeries, compared to multiple doses required by blood and other crystalloid.

== Alternatives to cardioplegia ==
In coronary surgery, there are various alternatives to cardioplegia to perform the operation. One is off-pump coronary surgery where the surgery is done without the need of a cardiopulmonary bypass machine. Another is to use cross-clamp fibrillation whereby the heart fibrillates whilst on cardiopulmonary bypass in order to perform the distal anastomoses.

== History ==
Cardiac surgical cases were performed with the aid of a cardiopulmonary pump, without cardioplegia or other means of protecting the heart. High mortality rates due to cardiac injury made surgeons to look on how to protect the heart. In 1955 D.G. Melrose suggested "elective cardiac arrest", a technique already used for other purposes, in order to protect the heart from ischemia; since the cardiac muscle is not working, oxygen demands should be low. In the 1960s other groups introduced ice slur applied all over the heart's surface. The rationale was to decrease the temperature of the heart, thus to reduce oxygen demands further.

During the next decades many investigators (Bretschneider, Kirch and others) came up with various solutions that could pause the heart without damaging cardiac muscle. In the same period, surgeons found out delivery roots for cardioplegia, other than the commonly used antegrade. Buckberg in North America and Menasche in Europe introduced the retrograde cardioplegia method, via a catheter inserted in the Coronary Sinus and thus perfusing the heart in a retrograde fashion.

== See also ==
- Action potential
- B05XA16 (WHO)
- Cardiopulmonary bypass
- Deep hypothermic circulatory arrest
- Membrane potential
- Resting potential

== Sources ==
- Kouchoukos, Nicholas; Blackstone, E. H.; Hanley, F. L.; Kirklin, J. K. (2013). Kirklin/Barratt-Boyes Cardiac Surgery E-Book (4th ed.). Elsevier. ISBN 978-1-4160-6391-9.
