= Ian Aird =

Scottish surgeon (1905–1962)

- Born: 4 July 1905; Edinburgh, Scotland
- Died: 17 September 1962 (aged 57); London, England
- Education: George Watson's College, Edinburgh; University of Edinburgh
- Occupation: Professor of Surgery
- Known for: Separation of conjoined twins; Role of blood groups in gastric cancer
- Medical career
- Institutions: Hammersmith Hospital, London
- Notable works: A Companion in Surgical Studies; The Making of a Surgeon

Ian Aird (4 July 1905 – 17 September 1962) was a Scottish surgeon who became Professor of Surgery at the Royal Postgraduate Medical School in London. There he built up a large and productive research department which made particular contributions in cardiac surgery, renal transplantation and the association of blood groups with stomach cancer. He came to national and international prominence in 1953 when he led the teams which performed an operation to separate conjoined twins. His book A Companion in Surgical Studies was among the best selling surgical textbooks of its day. He died suddenly in 1962 at the age of 57.

== Early life ==
Aird was born on 4 July 1905 in Corstorphine, an Edinburgh suburb, to William Aird (b. 1872), a master tailor, and his wife, Jean Elizabeth Ogle Aird (née Binnie). Aird attended George Watson's College, Edinburgh, from 1914 to 1923. Here he proved to be academically gifted and had a natural aptitude for languages. He was the only pupil in a school of around 1500 pupils to be selected to learn Russian in addition to the normal curriculum. His knowledge of Russian was to prove useful in later years. He studied medicine at the University of Edinburgh Medical School, where he was president of the university Student Christian Movement, and he maintained an interest in the Christian faith throughout his life, In 1928 he graduated MB ChB with the Annandale Gold Medal in Surgery and the Wightman Prize for Clinical Medicine. He was drawn to a career in surgery, inspired by the clinical teaching of J. M. Graham. After graduation he worked as house surgeon at Northampton General Hospital, then returned to Edinburgh as surgical assistant to the neurosurgeon Norman Dott at the Royal Hospital for Sick Children.

== Surgical training ==
In 1930, after a year spent learning at surgical clinics in Paris and Vienna, he passed the examinations to become a Fellow of the Royal College of Surgeons of Edinburgh (FRCSEd).

In 1931, he was appointed clinical tutor to J. M. Graham. He also carried out research in Professor Sir David Wilkie's research laboratories, where he began experimental studies on Hirschsprung's disease and on intestinal obstruction. As a result of this work he was awarded a Rockefeller Fellowship which enabled him to pursue his research and gain further experience in the Department of Surgery of Washington University in St. Louis School of Medicine under the direction of Evarts Graham. His work there on the pathophysiology of intestinal strangulation formed the basis of the thesis for which he was awarded the degree of Master of Surgery (ChM) with high commendation in 1935. Later in that year he was appointed Assistant Surgeon at the Royal Hospital for Sick Children in Edinburgh and succeeded to a full charge there in 1939.

== Surgical teacher ==
While working as an assistant surgeon in Edinburgh, he established, with his friend and colleague John Bruce, an evening and weekend tutorial course to prepare candidates for the FRCSEd examination. This became very popular and the bound sets of the detailed notes which he handed out to students on the course, all carefully annotated and referenced, were in great demand. These notes were to form the basis for his later best-selling textbook, A Companion in Surgical Studies.

== War service ==
With the outbreak of the Second World War, Aird was called up for service with the Royal Army Medical Corps and was posted initially to Plymouth with the rank of major. In 1941, promoted to Lt. Colonel, he served as surgeon in charge of a forward surgical unit of 17th Indian Field Ambulance, part of the Eighth Army in the North African campaign. During this time he was twice mentioned in dispatches and encountered the enemy commander-in-chief in unusual circumstances. As the tank warfare ebbed and flowed across the desert, Aird's field surgical unit was overrun by a Panzer column. The medical officer of the German unit sought out the surgeon in charge, and when Aird introduced himself, the German doctor asked "are you Aird of Edinburgh?" When an astonished Aird replied that he was, the German doctor went on to explain that he had read with interest Aird's work on intestinal obstruction. Aird was then asked to operate on a senior German officer, Fritz Stephan, who had sustained a serious chest wound. After successful resuscitation Aird performed a thoracotomy, watched by German officers, including, he later discovered, Field Marshal Erwin Rommel. As the injury had caused bleeding from the root of the lung it was not possible to stop the bleeding and Col. Stephan died. After the war Aird wrote poignantly of being visited in London by the officer's widow and son for whom he was able to describe the manner of Col. Stephan's death and where he had been buried. Aird found himself moved by their gratitude. Aird became one of the pioneers of the mobile forward surgical unit and described his experiences in a Honeyman-Gillespie lecture in 1944.

== Professor of surgery ==
After the war he returned to Edinburgh as surgeon to the Sick Children's Hospital and became deputy director of the Wilkie Surgical Research Laboratory. He returned with great enthusiasm to surgical research and postgraduate teaching. In 1946, he was appointed professor of surgery at the Royal Postgraduate Medical School at Hammersmith Hospital in London. He arrived at a department which had very limited accommodation and facilities, but which, over the next 15 years he was to develop into a surgical unit with an international reputation for research and innovation.

=== Separation of conjoined twins ===
He came to national prominence leading the surgical team which in 1953 separated Nigerian conjoined twins. This was a very rare procedure and attracted considerable media interest. One of the twins survived the procedure. Aird found the press coverage intrusive. He suggested greater co-operation between doctors and the media, recommending that to lessen intrusion, the press be given more and earlier information about such cases. This led to allegations that he had breached the code of ethics which pertained at the time over patient confidentiality, surgical anonymity and advertising. He had no private practice to benefit from publicity and so these allegations hurt him deeply.

=== Cardiac surgery ===
His department became involved in diverse areas of research including the Melrose-NEP heart-lung machine developed by a young surgeon Dennis Melrose, at that time a lecturer in Aird's department. After years of laboratory studies, this was used for the first time on a patient in 1953. The operation was successful and Melrose and William Cleland, a thoracic surgeon in Aird's department, joined the small band of pioneers of open heart surgery. They later developed the technique of potassium induced cardioplegia, a technique to stop the heart beating to facilitate open heart surgery. With Aird's fluency in Russian, he was able to forge strong links with that country. He arranged for Cleland and Melrose to travel to Moscow where they performed several cardiac operation under cardio-pulmonary bypass, and they are credited with introducing open heart surgery into Russia. Despite this the Medical Research Council refused Aird's request for funding to support further development of the heart-lung machine.

=== Renal transplantation ===
William J. Dempster, a Scottish surgeon who had trained in vascular surgery in France, carried out early animal renal transplants and explored the use of cortisone and radiation to suppress immunity and prolong graft survival. With Ralph Shackman, the urologist in Aird's team, he became an early pioneer of renal transplantation in the UK. Shackman and Dempster performed the first UK renal transplant between non-related donor and recipient.

=== Other research ===
Aird regarded his discovery of the association between blood groups and gastric disease as being among his most important contributions. In the 1940s peptic ulcer remained a major cause of morbidity and mortality and gastric cancer was one of the commonest malignancies. The incidence of both has declined dramatically since then. Aird and his team demonstrated that gastric cancer was significantly more common in people with blood group A while peptic ulcer was commoner in those with blood group O. This was subsequently confirmed in large scale national population studies.

He directed surgical research across a wide range of areas. Members of Aird's department included R H Franklin, who researched into causes of gastric and oesophageal cancer and who performed the first operation in Europe for tracheo-oesophageal fistula, Peter Martin was tasked by Aird to set up a vascular surgery unit, one of the first in the UK, which attracted surgeons from around the world who came to learn techniques of reconstructive vascular surgery. Geoffrey Knight, a neurosurgeon, became a pioneer in the controversial techniques known as psychosurgery and Selwyn Taylor gained an international reputation in the surgery of the thyroid and parathyroid glands. J S Calnan made important contributions in the field of experimental plastic surgery, particularly in the biology of surgical implants.

== James IV Association of Surgeons ==
In 1957, on the occasion of his being made an honorary fellow of the American College of Surgeons, Aird, together with Dr J William Hinton and Professor Sir John Bruce founded the James IV Association of Surgeons. Hinton was a surgeon at Bellevue Hospital, New York City and Chief of Surgery, at the Postgraduate Hospital, New York City and Bruce was Regius Professor of Clinical Surgery in Edinburgh. It was so named as Bruce had just learned that he had been elected president of the Royal College of Surgeons of Edinburgh, which had received royal endorsement of its charter from James IV, King of Scots in 1506. The Association is an international surgical society which aims to promote education and strengthen ties between surgeons around the world. Aird was elected first president of the association.

For many years he was a Council member of the Royal College of Surgeons of England, and served on the Court of Examiners, examining in many centres around the world. He also travelled widely as guest lecturer or surgical visitor to surgical departments around the globe. In 1950 he was elected a member of the Harveian Society of Edinburgh and he served as president in 1958.

== Publications ==
Perhaps his greatest legacy is in his writing, which he regarded as necessary for a successful career in surgery. His Companion in Surgical Studies, which was based on the lecture notes from his FRCS tutorial course, was first published in 1947. It ran to 999 pages and Aird was the sole author, unusual for a surgical textbook that time. It became, unofficially, required reading for the FRCS examination. A second edition was published in 1958. A revised edition The new Aird's companion in surgical studies appeared in 1992 as a multi author work and ran to a 3rd edition in 2005. The fact that this successor book required so many different contributors, experts in so many different medical and surgical fields, demonstrates that Aird's original textbook was among the last in an era in which any one individual could write an authoritative book that covered the whole field of surgical practice.

The making of a surgeon (1961) was a distillation of his own surgical philosophy, describing his surgical journey and full of hints and advice for aspiring surgeons. This too was widely read.

== Personal life and death ==
On 21 December 1936 Aird married Ivy Beatrice Margaret (known as 'Peggy') Cowes (1907–1992) whose father, William Cowes, originally from Scotland, had been a businessman in Buenos Aires.

Aird suffered from depression, and died on 17 September 1962 after taking an overdose of barbiturates in his room at Hammersmith Hospital. He was survived by his wife, son, and daughter.

== Selected publications ==
- A companion to surgical studies. Edinburgh, Livingstone 1949.
- The making of a surgeon. London, Butterworth 1961.
- Military surgery in geographical perspective. Edinburgh Medical Journal 1944, 51, 166–183.
- Surgery of peripheral nerve injury. Postgraduate Medical Journal 1946, 22, 225–254.
- Genesis of peptic ulceration. Edinburgh Medical Journal 1949, 56, 89–98.
- Conjoined twins of Kano. British Medical Journal 1954, 1, 831–837.
