= Banff Classification =

Schema for classification of kidney transplant pathology

The Banff Classification is a schema for nomenclature and classification of kidney transplant pathology, established in 1991 by Kim Solez and Lorraine C. Racusen in Banff, Canada. The initiative was "inspired by the then recent development of a consensus grading system for diagnosis of rejection in cardiac allografts led by Dr Margaret Billingham, a key participant at the first Banff transplant pathology meeting". Prior the Banff Classification there was no standardized, international classification for renal allograft biopsies, which resulted in considerable heterogeneity among pathologists in characterization of renal allograft biopsies. The first Banff schema was published in 1993, and has since undergone updates at regular intervals. The classification is expanded and updated every two years in meetings organized by the Banff Foundation for Allograft Pathology. An evaluation of the Banff Classification in March 2000 confirmed significant association between the revised Banff '97 classification and graft outcome. The classification is unusual in that there is no competing standard. It has been used worldwide for 28+ years and shows how useful consensus meetings in a medical subspecialty area can be. In 2018 a user guide for the classification was published in the journal Transplantation.
