= Ascending aorta =

Part of the heart

- The ascending aorta and aortic arch with their branches

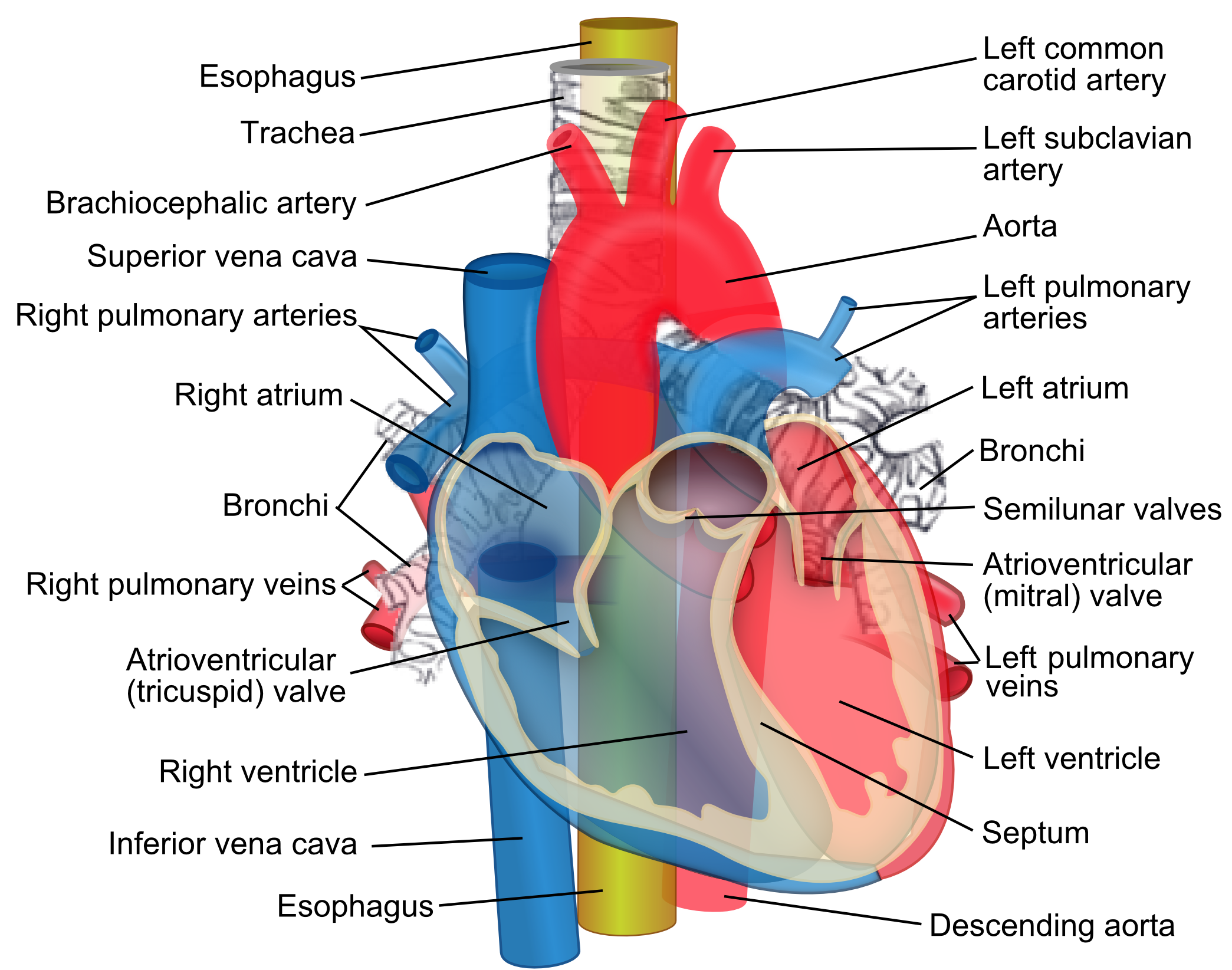
- Course of the ascending aorta (anterior view), as it passes dorsally to the pulmonary trunk but ventrally to the right pulmonary artery.

Details
- Precursor: Truncus arteriosus
- Source: Left ventricle
- Branches: Left coronary artery, right coronary artery and continues as the aortic arch
- Vein: Combination of superior and inferior vena cava and coronary sinus
- Supplies: The entire body, with exception of the respiratory zone of the lung

Identifiers
- Latin: aorta ascendens, pars ascendens aortae
- TA98: A12.2.03.001
- TA2: 4176
- FMA: 3736

The ascending aorta (AAo) is a portion of the aorta commencing at the upper part of the base of the left ventricle, on a level with the lower border of the third costal cartilage behind the left half of the sternum.

== Structure ==
It passes obliquely upward, forward, and to the right, in the direction of the heart's axis, as high as the upper border of the second right costal cartilage, describing a slight curve in its course, and being situated, about 6 centimetres (2.4 in) behind the posterior surface of the sternum. The total length is about 5 centimetres (2.0 in).

=== Components ===
The aortic root is the portion of the aorta beginning at the aortic annulus and extending to the sinotubular junction. It is sometimes regarded as a part of the ascending aorta, and sometimes regarded as a separate entity from the rest of the ascending aorta.

Between each commissure of the aortic valve and opposite the cusps of the aortic valve, three small dilations called the sinuses of Valsalva.

The sinotubular junction is the point in the ascending aorta where the sinuses of Valsalva end and the aorta becomes a tubular structure.

=== Size ===
A thoracic aorta diameter greater than 3.5 cm is generally considered dilated, whereas a diameter greater than 4.5 cm is generally considered to be a thoracic aortic aneurysm. Still, the average diameter in the population varies by for example age and sex. The upper limit of standard reference range of the ascending aorta may be up to 4.3 cm among large, elderly individuals.

== Relations ==
At the union of the ascending aorta with the aortic arch the caliber of the vessel is increased, owing to a bulging of its right wall.

This dilatation is termed the bulb of the aorta, and on transverse section presents a somewhat oval figure.

The ascending aorta is contained within the pericardium, and is enclosed in a tube of the serous pericardium, common to it and the pulmonary artery.

The ascending aorta is covered at its commencement by the trunk of the pulmonary artery and the right auricula, and, higher up, is separated from the sternum by the pericardium, the right pleura, the anterior margin of the right lung, some loose areolar tissue, and the remains of the thymus; posteriorly, it rests upon the left atrium and right pulmonary artery.

On the right side, it is in relation with the superior vena cava and right atrium, the former lying partly behind it; on the left side, with the pulmonary artery.

== Branches ==
The only branches of the ascending aorta are the two coronary arteries which supply the heart; they arise near the commencement of the aorta from the aortic sinuses which are opposite the aortic valve.

== Clinical significance ==
Porcelain aorta is extensive atherosclerotic calcification of the ascending aorta. It makes aortic surgery difficult, especially aortic cross-clamping, and incisions may result in excessive aortic injury and/or arterial embolism.

The ascending aorta segment is of significance due to its susceptibility to aortic dissection, two times more than in the descending aorta. Early detection of dissection is critical because it allows for prompt intervention to prevent potentially life-threatening complications.

== Diagnostics ==
Diagnostic methods such as echocardiography, magnetic resonance imaging (MRI) and computed tomography (CT) scans, often with contrast enhancement, are used in the detection of pathology and evaluation of ascending aorta.

== Images ==
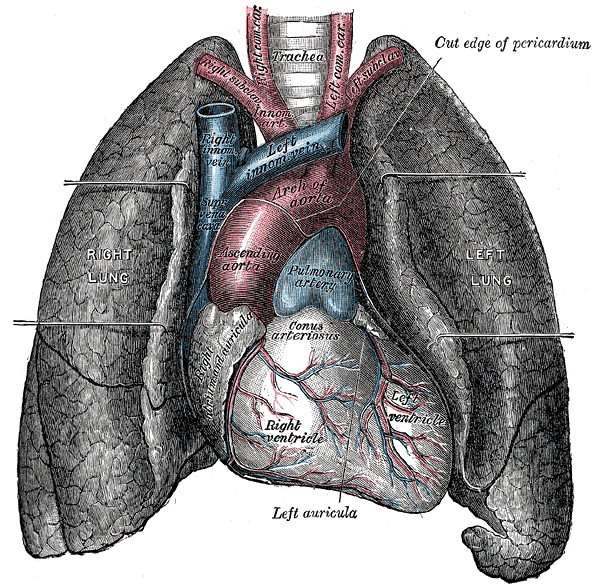
Front view of heart and lungs.

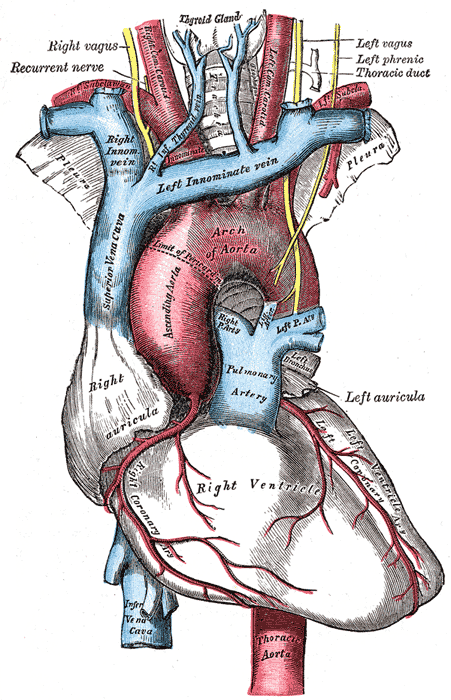
The arch of the aorta, and its branches.

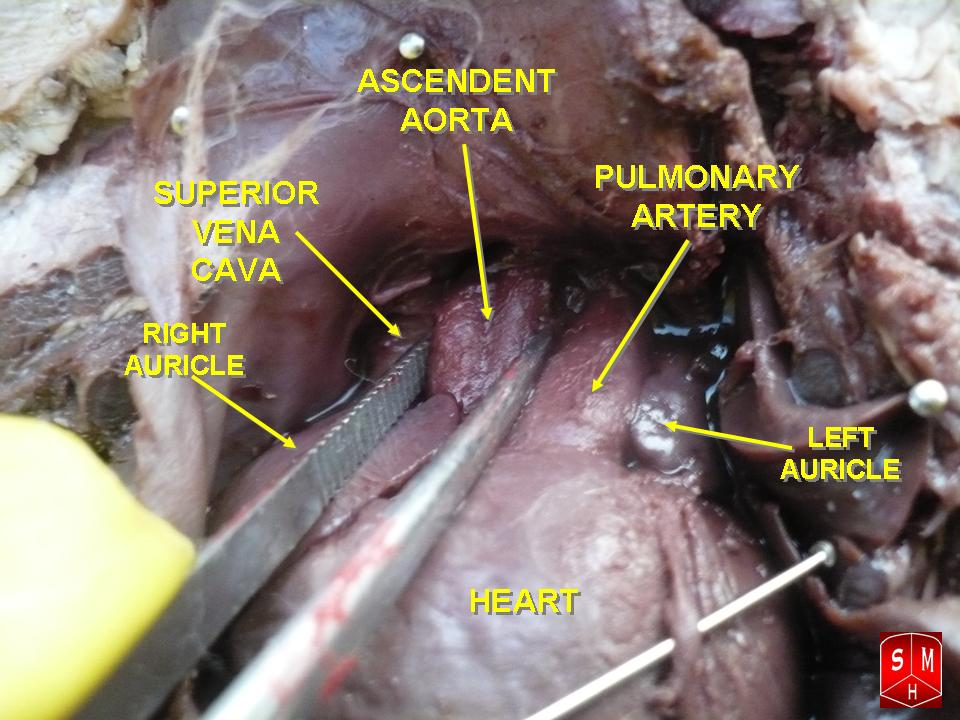
Fetal ascending aorta

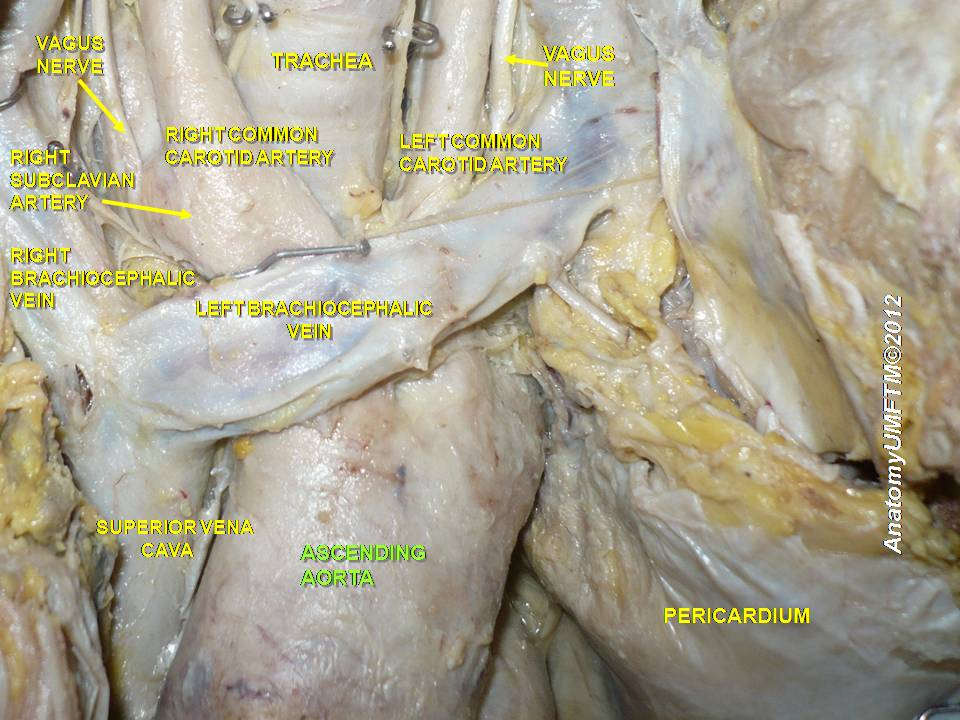
Ascending aorta

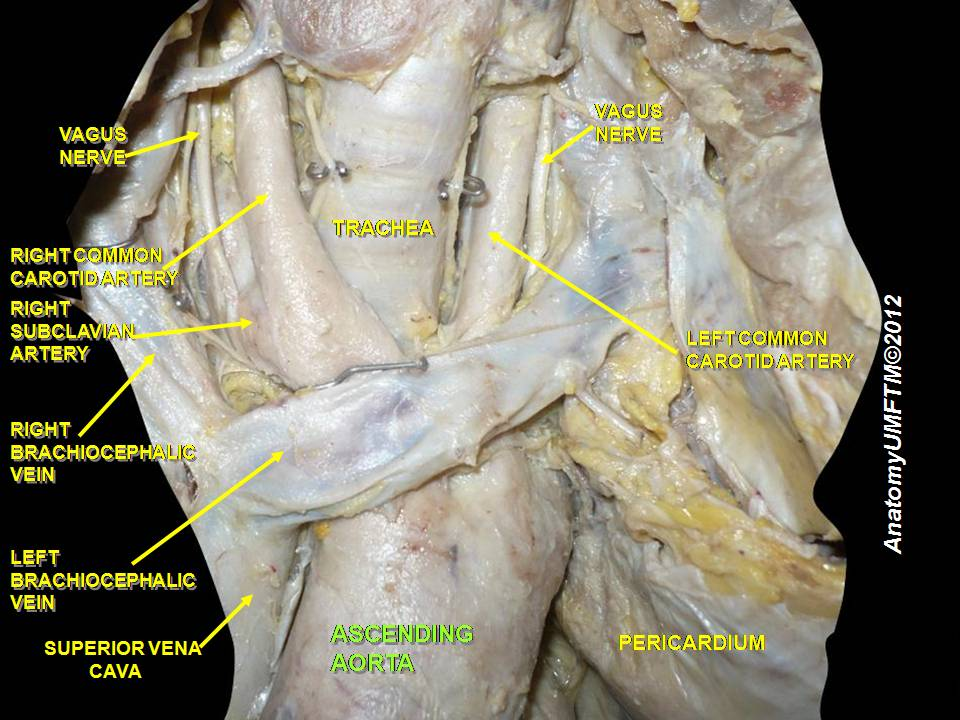
Ascending aorta

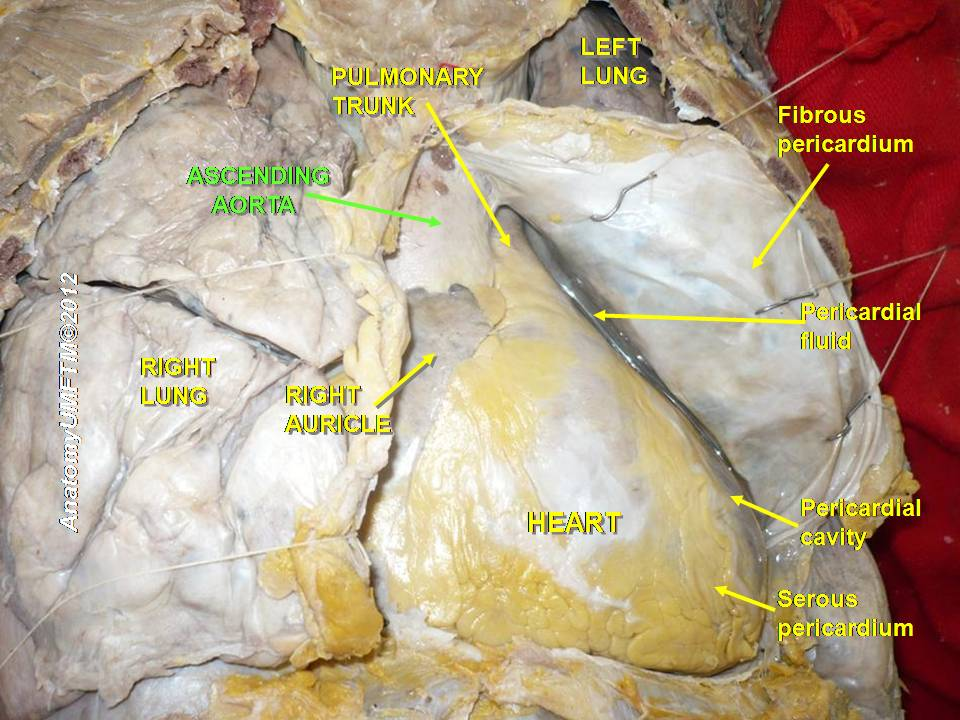
Ascending aorta

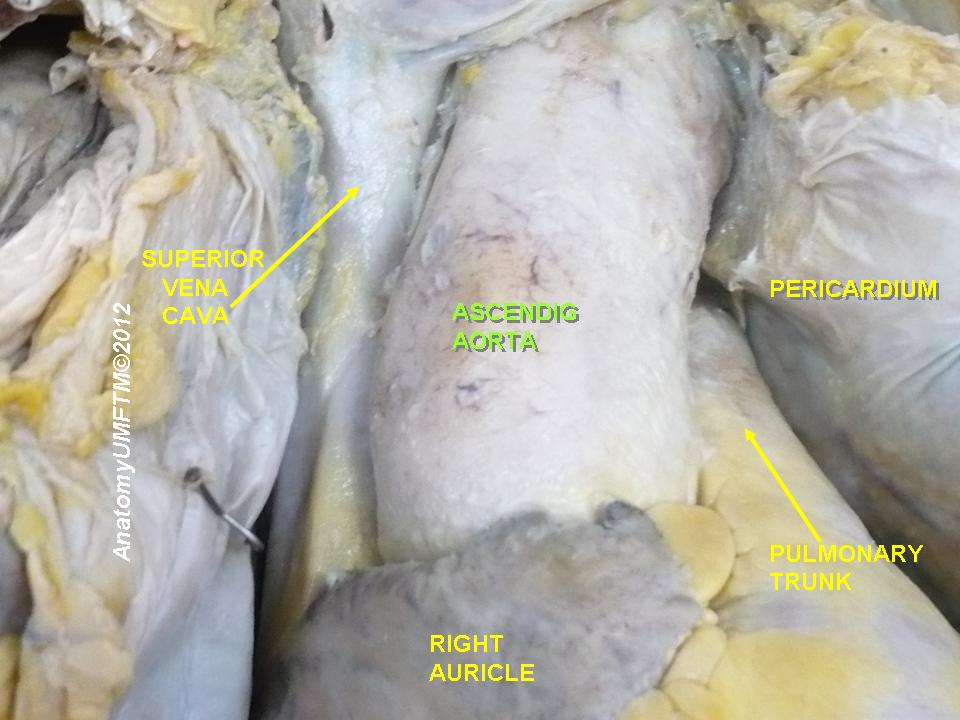
Ascending aorta

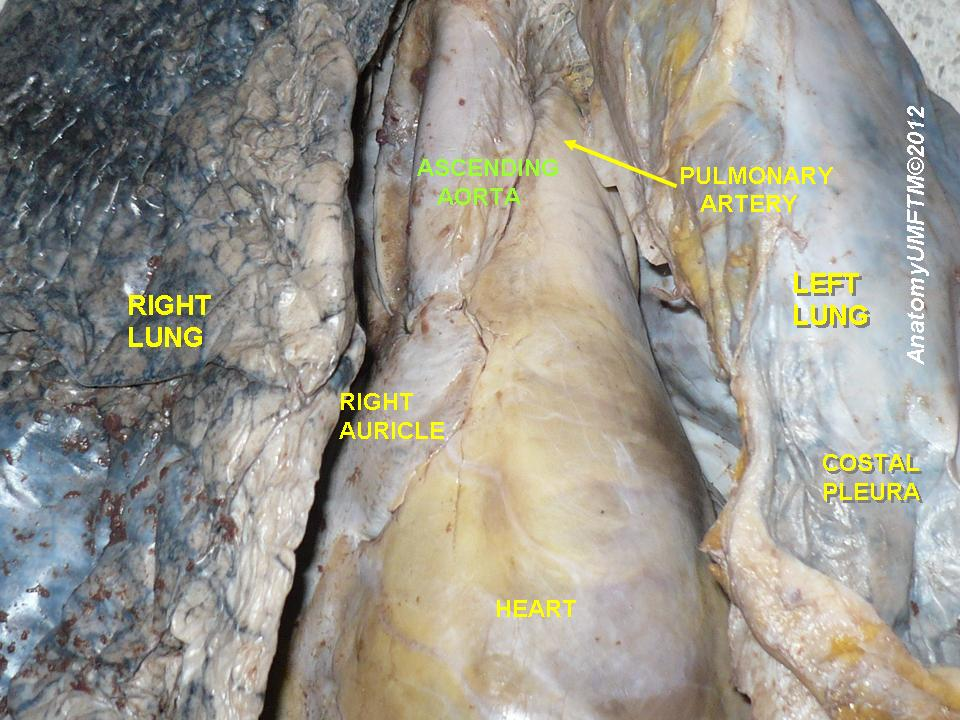
Ascending aorta

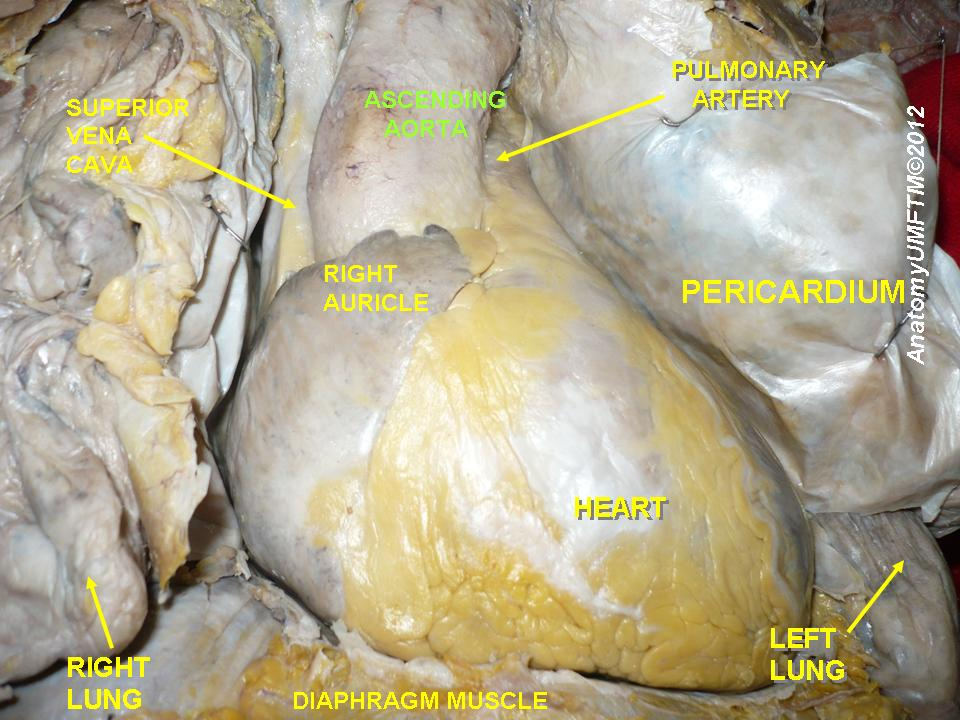
Ascending aorta

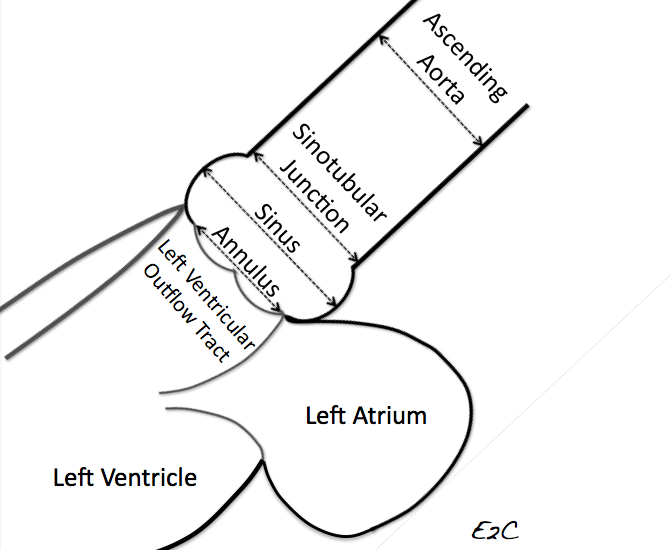
Ascending aorta
