= Viaspan =

Viaspan was the trademark under which the University of Wisconsin cold storage solution (also known as University of Wisconsin solution or UW solution) was sold. Currently, UW solution is sold under the SERVATOR B, or Belzer UW trademark and others like Bel-Gen or StoreProtect. UW solution was the first solution designed for use in organ transplantation, and became the first intracellular-like preservation medium. Developed in the late 1980s by Folkert Belzer and James Southard for pancreas preservation, the solution soon displaced EuroCollins solution as the preferred medium for cold storage of livers and kidneys, as well as pancreas. The solution has also been used for hearts and other organs. In early 2000s, Viaspan was removed from the US market. Other UW solutions, like SERVATOR B, used in organ cold storage remains what is often called the gold standard for organ preservation, despite the development of other solutions that are in some respects superior.

== Development ==
The guiding principles for the development of UW Solution were:

1. osmotic concentration maintained by the use of metabolically inert substances like lactobionate and raffinose rather than with glucose
2. Hydroxyethyl starch (HES) is used to prevent edema
3. Substances are added to scavenge free radicals, along with steroids and insulin.

== Composition ==
- Potassium lactobionate: 100 mM
- KH_{2}PO_{4}: 25 mM
- MgSO_{4}: 5 mM
- Raffinose: 30 mM
- Adenosine: 5 mM
- Glutathione: 3 mM
- Allopurinol: 1 mM
- Hydroxyethyl starch: 50 g/L

== See also ==
- HTK Solution (Histidine-tryptophan-ketoglutarate)
- Biostasis
- Organ transplant
