= Charles Rob =

British surgeon (1913–2001)

Charles Rob MC FRCS
- Charles Rob as a 1st Lt. in the Royal Army Medical Corps, Tunisia, 1943.
- Born: Charles Granville Rob; 4 May 1913; Weybridge, England, United Kingdom
- Died: 26 July 2001 (aged 88); Berlin, Germany
- Education: St John's College, Cambridge
- Known for: Carotid endarterectomy; First deceased donor kidney transplant; Aortic aneurysm repair procedures
- Medical career
- Profession: Surgeon
- Field: Transplant surgeon
- Sub-specialties: Vascular surgery
- Awards: René Leriche prize

Charles Granville Rob MC FRCS (4 May 1913 – 26 July 2001) was a British surgeon who pioneered techniques in the repair of damaged blood vessels, particularly the operation to unblock arteries in the neck, known as carotid endarterectomy and of the aorta when treating aortic aneurysms.

After graduating from Cambridge University and St Thomas' Hospital Medical School, Rob operated throughout the Blitz and in the Tunisian Campaign, where he received the Military Cross.

After the Second World War, Rob became the youngest chief of surgery at St. Mary's Hospital, London and he also lead the vascular surgery program at St Mary's Hospital, London where he carried out one of the world's first carotid endarterectomies and a year later performed the UK's first deceased donor human-to-human kidney transplant. His contributions paved the way for St Mary's in becoming a pioneering centre in vascular surgery and transplant surgery.

In 1960, he moved to the United States and continued developing techniques in vascular surgery including vein by-pass grafting.

== Early life and education ==
Charles Rob was born on 4 May 1913 in Weybridge, England. His father was Joseph William Rob, a family physician, who came from the farming and landowning family in Catton near Thirsk, Yorkshire. The Robs traced their ancestry from Loch Lomond, Scotland where they owned a successful cattle droving business, which continued after they settled in Yorkshire in the 1680s. and his mother was a descendant of Edward "Grog" Vernon, the British Admiral who introduced diluted rum for Royal Navy sailors in the 18th century.

He was educated at Hordle House and Oundle before going on to graduate from St John's College, Cambridge, in 1934. During his time there, he once climbed one of the spires of King's College to place an open umbrella on the top. He also joined the university air squadron to train to be a pilot. After receiving a reserve commission as a pilot in the Royal Air Force he transferred to St Thomas's Hospital for his clinical attachment. In 1937, he graduated with an MB from Cambridge University.

He became a member of the Royal College of Surgeons in 1937 and, after two years of surgical training at St Thomas's, he gained his FRCS.

== Second World War ==
At the onset of the Second World War in 1939, Rob was at the Royal Victoria Hospital, Montreal, but shortly returned to St Thomas's hospital to work throughout the Blitz (1940–1941). There, he met Mary Dorothy Elaine Beazley, who had worked as secretary and secret courier to Royal Air Force officer William Wedgwood Benn, and had subsequently enrolled in the Florence Nightingale School. They married six weeks later and later had two sons and two daughters. Joseph William Rob, Peter James Rob, Caroline Rob Zaleski and Rebecca Rob Podore.

He was later made resident assistant surgeon at Hydestile Hospital, close to Godalming and had also operated in bunkered operating rooms at St. Mary's hospital.

He joined the Royal Army Medical Corps in November 1942 and was posted to the 1st Parachute Battalion as a surgical specialist. He took part in the mission to seize the Souk-el-Arba Airfields and the road junction at Béja during the Tunisian Campaign. Here, he performed more than 150 operations after converting the French garrison school into a hospital. He suffered a left tibia and kneecap fracture when a bomb fell, and was reported to have used his own blood to transfuse a wounded person. After 24 days, he had treated over 200 people.

He was awarded the Military Cross for his efforts. After leaving Tunisia he took up command of a field surgical unit in Sicily and Italy and became lieutenant colonel.

== Surgical career in England ==
Upon return to London after the Second World War, Rob resumed duties at St Thomas' Hospital and later became professor of surgery at the University of London and St. Mary's Hospital in 1950. During his time as professor of surgery, he was involved in the vascular surgery programme and also became advisor to royalty and Winston Churchill, and in 1959 several times assessed the blood clot in Churchill's little finger.

Michael DeBakey performed the first carotid endarterectomy in 1953 and the procedure became better known after Rob and his colleagues performed one in 1954. The operation proved to reduce the risk of stroke in patients with significant blocked carotid arteries and he reported to have carried out more than 5000 of these operations in his lifetime. In addition, he introduced using frozen cadaver arterial grafts in the treatment of aortic aneurysms. In 1955, he presented his experiences of over 30 abdominal aortic aneurysms to the Royal College of Surgeons.

In 1955, Rob performed the UK's first recorded deceased donor kidney transplant with Hammersmith hospital's surgeon Jim Dempster, at St Mary's Hospital. The recipient had developed acute renal failure following a septic abortion and was considered by Dempster as not ideal for transplant and an unnecessary fatal disaster. However, it instilled an interest in further transplantation developments at St Mary's, which became regarded as pioneers in this field.

== Surgical career in the United States ==
In 1960 Rob accepted the position of chief of the Department of Surgery at the University of Rochester, Strong Memorial Hospital and moved to the United States. Here, he continued to develop the technique of vein by-pass grafting.

In 1961, after recalling that cloth grafts had been used in the aortas of pigs, he used his nylon shirt to successfully repair an aortic aneurysm in a human. After debriding and resecting the aneurysm, the two open ends of the aorta needed to be rejoined with a graft, but the surgeons found that no graft was available to complete the procedure. To the surprise of his colleagues in theatre, Rob called for the shirt in his locker, cut out a rectangle and stitched it into a tube to be used as a graft, possibly the first use of a synthetic vascular graft in a human. The patient survived and the assistant recalled meeting the patient again eight years later.

After retiring in 1978, he moved to East Carolina University, taking an appointment as professor of surgery. Five years later he joined the Uniformed Services University of the Health Sciences at Bethesda, near Washington DC. He was a past president of the International Society of Cardiovascular Surgery and the North American Chapter of the International Cardiovascular Society. He was awarded the René Leriche prize of the International Society of Surgery. In 1994, he required a carotid endarterectomy himself.

== Death and legacy ==
Rob died of heart disease while visiting relatives on 26 July 2001 in Montpellier, Vt. Apart from his medical innovations, he has been remembered for his saying on the treatment of a gangrenous limb: "The best treatment for the condition is rest. The best way to rest is sleep. The best way to get sleep is to relieve pain, and the best way to relieve pain is to give whiskey."

== Selected publications ==
Rob published more than 200 papers. His book publications included:

- Operative Surgery. 8 vols. Butterworths, London, 1956. (edited with Rodney Smith)
