= Banff Foundation for Allograft Pathology =

Banff Foundation For Allograft Pathology
- Established: 2013
- Founder: Kim Solez
- Website: http://banfffoundation.org/

The Banff Foundation for Allograft Pathology also known as the Banff Foundation for Transplant Pathology is a nonprofit Swiss foundation which aims to "lead development and dissemination of the international Banff Classification of Allograft Pathology and to facilitate multidisciplinary, collaborative research to enhance its scientific basis and clinical utility to improve the care of transplant patients". Its predecessor group had organized transplant pathology meetings in every odd numbered year since 1991 and the Foundation has specific future meeting plans through 2025. The meetings establish and maintain the worldwide standards for tissue biopsy reporting and diagnosis of transplant rejection through consensus decision making. They thereby provide an essential service to the field of allotransplantation. The goals of the Banff foundation are to facilitate knowledge generation and translation in transplantation pathology with the ultimate aim of improving patient outcomes, maintaining the Banff meeting spirit of a multinational, multidisciplinary consensus group, raising funds for research and education in transplantation pathology, providing guidance and financial support for Working Group activities and Banff meetings activities. Kim Solez is the Chair of the Banff Foundation for Allograft Pathology. The 2015 Banff Conference for Allograft Pathology was held in conjunction with the Canadian Society of Transplantation in Vancouver, BC, and included consideration of molecular pathology and tissue engineering pathology as well as traditional light microscopy, immunofluorescence, and electron microscopy. The 2017 Banff Conference was held in Barcelona, Spain. The 2019 Banff Conference was held in Pittsburgh, Pennsylvania, and the 2021 Banff Conference will be in Banff, Alberta, Canada.

== See also ==
- Pathology
- Renal pathology
