= Ralph Shackman =

Ralph Shackman (29 March 1910 - June 1981), was the first professor of urology at the Hammersmith Hospital, who did significant research in kidney failure, hemodialysis, and kidney transplantation. With Jim Dempster, in 1960, he performed one of Britain's first human kidney transplantations.
