= Jim Dempster =

British surgeon (1918 – 2008)

William James Dempster
- Born: 15 March 1918; Ibo, Portuguese Mozambique
- Died: 27 July 2008 (aged 90)
- Education: University of Edinburgh
- Medical career
- Profession: Surgeon
- Institutions: St Mary's Hospital, London
- Sub-specialties: Transplant researcher

William James Dempster (15 March 1918 – 27 July 2008) was a British surgeon and researcher in organ transplantation at St Mary’s Hospital, London. He published more than 100 scientific reviews and papers on kidney transplant rejection in dogs, confirming that rejection was an example of immune response, mediated by serum antibodies.

== Early life ==
Dempster was born on the island of Ibo, Portuguese Mozambique, to Jessie and James Dempster, who raised cattle in Portuguese East Africa until the tsetse fly caused the business to collapse. His birth was registered on 28 April 1918 and his birth certificate was issued on 9 August of the same year. However, his real date of birth was 15 March 1918. He survived malaria in early childhood.

Following his father's sudden premature death soon after August 1919, his mother took the family back to Edinburgh where Dempster then entered George Heriot's School and where he was active in rugby and cricket.

He gained admission to the University of Edinburgh to study medicine, where he was a contemporary of Sheila Sherlock, with whom he played tennis.

== Family and personal ==
He met Cherry Clark, a nurse in the radiotherapy department at the Hammersmith Hospital who had once been a ballet dancer. They married and had two sons and one daughter.

== Medical career ==
After qualifying and a brief time working as a locum general practitioner, Dempster joined the Royal Air Force and served in India and Burma during the Second World War.

In 1946, looking for work, he met Sheila Sherlock again, who was working at the Hammersmith Hospital. At her suggestion, he applied and was accepted to Ian Aird's surgical unit at the Postgraduate Hospital, Hammersmith, as a researcher in organ transplantation, investigating the outcome of dog kidney allografts.

He worked at the Royal College of Surgeon's Buckston Browne Farm, with Sir Arthur Keith, an anatomist and anthropologist, and jokingly referred to the job as one of the hospital's worst roles. Despite this, within six years, he produced more than 100 articles on kidney transplantations in dogs and achieved worldwide acknowledgment for his work. His detailed observations on a macroscopic and microscopic scale, established that organ rejection was a type of immune response, facilitated by serum antibodies. The post-war interest in kidney transplantation was paralleled by a growing knowledge that immunological mechanisms were involved in rejection. Simultaneous work by Morten Simonsen and René Küss found that placing the donor kidney in the pelvis was preferable to a superficial site and all concluded that an immunological mechanism was responsible for rejection.

Subsequently, Dempster became acquainted with international organ transplantation peers including Georges Mathé of Paris, who also believed that immunological reactions explained graft rejection. Dempster and his associates demonstrated that irradiating the whole body could suppress delayed type hypersensitivity reactions and the response to skin allografts. This primary immunosuppressive therapy with total body irradiation was also used by Hamburger. In addition, he foresaw the concept of graft-versus-host responses. Despite these research results, clinical application appeared distant as Ian Aird was more committed to research.

In 1956, Dempster joined Charles Rob’s surgical team at St Mary’s Hospital, in performing a renal transplant on a person with acute renal failure. Typically frank and forthright, he described the procedure as an unnecessary tragedy, although it did create an interest in transplantation at St Mary’s Hospital.

In 1960 with Ralph Shackman, he carried out some of the earliest kidney transplants in the UK.

== Later life ==
Dempster retired to his home in Twickenham and dedicated his remaining time to painting and gardening. He had a particular interest in the work of John Hunter and promoted the cause of evolutionary theorist Patrick Matthew of whom he published a biography in 1983. Matthew's life had parallels with that of Charles Darwin, and wrote about natural selection almost 30 years before Darwin did in his 1859, On the Origin of Species.

Following Cherry's death in 2005, Dempster was looked after by his daughter, Soula, who lived nearby. He died on 27 July 2008.

== Selected publications ==
- "The Anurias following Kidney Transplantation", Journal of Internal Medicine, Vol. 148, Issue 2, January/December 1954, pp. 91–100.
- "Transplantaron of Ureters: An Experimental Study in Dogs", British Journal of Surgery, Vol. 44, Issue 185, November 1956, pp. 225–232.
- An Introduction to Experimental Surgical Studies. Blackwell Scientific Publications, Oxford, 1957.
- Patrick Matthew and Natural Selection. Paul Harris Publishing, Edinburgh, 1983. ISBN 0862280656
