= John P. Merrill =

American physician

- Dr. John P. Merrill (left) explains the workings of a then-new machine called an artificial kidney to Richard Herrick (middle) and his brother Ronald (right). The Herrick twin brothers were the subjects of the world's first successful kidney transplant, Ronald being the donor.
- Born: March 10, 1917; Hartford, Connecticut
- Died: April 14, 1984 (aged 67); Hope Town, Bahamas
- Known for: nephrology kidney transplant
- Medical career
- Profession: physician medical researcher
- Institutions: Peter Bent Brigham Hospital; Harvard Medical School
- Research: nephrology

John Putnam Merrill (March 10, 1917 – April 14, 1984) was an American physician and medical researcher. He led the team which performed the world's first successful kidney transplant. He generally credited as the "father of nephrology" or "the founder of nephrology," which is the scientific study of the kidney and its diseases.

== Early life ==
Merrill was born in 1917 in Hartford, Connecticut. After graduating from Dartmouth College in 1938, he attended the Harvard Medical School. He graduated in 1942; and he was an intern at the Peter Bent Brigham Hospital.

During World War II, he served for four years in the Army. Two years were spent on Kwajalein Island in the Pacific with "Operation Crossroads."

== Career ==
Merrill's entire career was spent in Boston at Peter Bent Brigham Hospital, now known as Brigham and Women's Hospital. His work as a medical researcher began in 1947. As a resident in medicine, he was assigned to head the team which developed an artificial kidney (the Brigham-Kolff dialyzers) for use in the treatment of acute and chronic kidney failure.

With our tradition of kidney disease research, we felt we should sponsor the so-called artificial kidney. But who could take on this complex—and risky—research project? My choice was John P. Merrill. With his excellent medical background ... four years as a flight surgeon ... interest in cardiorenal disease ... and the intellectual curiosity that characterizes a born researcher ... he was ideally suited.

— Dr. George W. Thorn, Physician in chief, Peter Bent Brigham Hospital, 1942–1972.

In 1950, Merrill began teaching at Harvard Medical School.

In 1954, Merrill headed the multidisciplinary team that performed the first successful transplant of a kidney between identical twin brothers.

Merrill was made a full professor at Harvard Medical School in 1970. His legacy is found in his students and in those doctors he mentored.

=== Chronology ===
1947–1950	residency, Brigham Hospital
1950–1956	investigator, Howard Hughes Medical Institute at the Brigham Hospital
1952	Necker-Enfants Malades Hospital, Paris
1954	kidney transplant
1950–1984	faculty, Harvard Medical School

Merrill's career was cut short when he died on April 14, 1984, in a boating accident while vacationing in the Bahamas.

== Selected works ==
In a statistical overview derived from writings by and about John Merrill, OCLC/WorldCat encompasses roughly 20+ works in 30+ publications in 3 languages and 400+ library holdings .

- 1980 – The role of the kidney in human hypertension.
- 1980 – Factors Influencing Renal Vasculature During Anesthesia, Trauma, and Oliguric Renal Failure States in Man
- 1977 – Electrolyte Imbalance
- 1974 – Present Status of Kidney Transplantation
- 1973 – Topics in Nephrology
- 1973 – Squirrel Island, Maine: the First Hundred Years
- 1971 – Uremia; Progress in Pathophysiology and Treatment
- 1971 – Artificial Organs and Cardiopulmonary Support Systems
- 1969 – Treatment of acute renal failure
- 1967 – Il trattamento dell'insufficienza renale
- 1963 – Reversible Renal Failure
- 1959 – Die Behandlung der Niereninsuffizienz therapeutische Grundlagen der Behandlung akuter und chronischer Urämie unter besonderer Berücksichtigung des Elektrolythaushaltes
- 1959 – Die Behandlung der Niereninsuffienz (The Treatment of Renal Failure)
- 1955 – The Treatment of Renal Failure; Therapeutic Principles in the Management of Acute and Chronic Uremia

== Honors ==
- Gairdner Foundation International Award, 1969
- American Society for Clinical Investigation, president, 1963

== Notes ==
    8.  Dept of Veterans Affairs BIRLS Death File
