= Robert Heptinstall =

English pathologist (1920–2021)

Robert H. "Heppy" Heptinstall (20 July 1920 – 5 January 2021) was an English pathologist specialising in renal pathology. He was the chair of the department of pathology at Johns Hopkins Hospital for 19 years.

== Career ==
Heptinstall was born in Great Britain and earned his medical degree from Charing Cross Hospital Medical School in London. He served in the British Army during World War II as part of Force 136, parachuting into Japanese-occupied Thailand to care for freed prisoners of war. After the war, he did postgraduate study under Alexander Fleming. He moved to the United States in 1954 to serve a fellowship at Johns Hopkins Hospital.

From 1960 to 1962 Heptinstall was a visiting professor of pathology at Washington University School of Medicine. In 1962, he moved to Hopkins as a professor. He was appointed acting director of the pathology department in 1966. In 1969 he was named the Baxley professor of pathology, pathologist in chief, and director of the department, titles he held until 1988. He continued at Hopkins as a professor of pathology until 1991 and as a distinguished service professor emeritus until 2014.

His research and publishing on the subject of renal disease helped to establish the link between hypertension, kidney disease, and atherosclerosis. His book Pathology of the Kidney, first published in 1966, is now in its seventh edition and is known as Heptinstall's Pathology of the Kidney. It is described as "the singular textbook on renal pathology" and "the Bible of renal pathology".

== Offices held ==
Offices held included:

- President of American Society of Nephrology, 1972–1973
- President of the Renal Pathology Society, 1980–1983
- Vice president of the International Society of Nephrology, 1981–1984.

== Recognition ==
Recognition during his lifetime included:

- Gold medal from the Danish Surgical Society
- David M. Hume Memorial Award from the National Kidney Foundation
- Jean Hamburger Award from the International Society of Nephrology
- In 2011, the Renal Pathology Society renamed its lifetime achievement award as the Robert H. Heptinstall Lifetime Achievement Award.
- In 2020 to honor his hundredth birthday, Hopkins established a Robert H. Heptinstall Fellowship.

== Personal ==
He died on 5 January 2021, a few months after his hundredth birthday.
