= Lactobionic acid =

Names
- IUPAC name (2R,3R,4R)-2,3,5,6-Tetrahydroxy-4-[ [(2S,3R,4S,5R,6R)-3,4,5-trihydroxy-6-(hydroxymethyl)-2-tetrahydropyranyl]oxy]hexanoic acid
- Other names Galactosylgluconic acid

Identifiers
CAS Number	96-82-2
3D model (JSmol)	Interactive image
ChEBI	CHEBI:55481
ChEMBL	ChEMBL3039602
ChemSpider	7040
DrugBank	DB16621
ECHA InfoCard	100.002.309
EC Number	202-538-3
E number	E399 (antioxidants, ...)
KEGG	C22921
PubChem CID	7314
UNII	65R938S4DV
CompTox Dashboard (EPA)	DTXSID3048861
- InChI: InChI=1S/C12H22O12/c13-1-3(15)10(7(18)8(19)11(21)22)24-12-9(20)6(17)5(16)4(2-14)23-12/h3-10,12-20H,1-2H2,(H,21,22)/t3-,4-,5+,6+,7-,8-,9-,10-,12+/m1/s1 Key: JYTUSYBCFIZPBE-AMTLMPIISA-N
- SMILES: O[C@@H]1[C@H](O)[C@@H](O)[C@H](O[C@@]([C@H](O)CO)([H])[C@H](O)[C@@H](O)C(O)=O)O[C@@H]1CO

Properties
Chemical formula	C_{12}H_{22}O_{12}
Molar mass	358.296 g·mol^{−1}
Appearance	Syrup
Solubility in water	Freely soluble
- Except where otherwise noted, data are given for materials in their standard state (at 25 °C [77 °F], 100 kPa). verify (what is ?) Infobox references

Lactobionic acid (4-O-β-galactopyranosyl-D-gluconic acid) is a sugar acid. It is a disaccharide formed from gluconic acid and galactose. It can be formed by oxidation of lactose. The carboxylate anion of lactobionic acid is known as lactobionate.

As an acid, lactobionic acid can form salts with mineral cations such as calcium, potassium, sodium and zinc. Calcium lactobionate is a food additive used as a stabilizer. Potassium lactobionate is added to organ preservation solutions such as Viaspan or CoStorSol to provide osmotic support and prevent cell swelling. Mineral salts of lactobionic acid are also used for mineral supplementation.

Lactobionic acid is also used in the cosmetics industry as an antioxidant and in the pharmaceutical industry as an excipient for formulation. For example, the antibiotic erythromycin is used as the salt erythromycin lactobionate when intravenously delivered.
