= Histidine-tryptophan-ketoglutarate =

Preservative for donor organs

Histidine-tryptophan-ketoglutarate (HTK) is a high-flow, low-potassium preservation solution used for organ transplantation. The solution was initially developed by Hans-Jürgen Bretschneider. Currently, HTK Solution is sold under the SERVATOR H or Custodial trademarks.

HTK solution is intended for perfusion and flushing of donor liver, kidney, heart, lung and pancreas prior to removal from the donor and for preserving these organs during hypothermic storage and transport to the recipient. HTK solution is based on the principle of inactivating organ function by withdrawal of extracellular sodium and calcium, together with intensive buffering of the extracellular space by means of histidine/histidine hydrochloride, so as to prolong the period during which the organs will tolerate interruption of oxygenated blood. The composition of HTK is similar to that of intracellular fluid. All of the components of HTK occur naturally in the body. The osmolarity of HTK is 310 mOsm/L.

== Composition ==
- Sodium: 15 mmol/L
- Potassium: 9 mmol/L
- Magnesium: 4 mmol/L
- Calcium: 0.015 mmol/L
- Ketoglutarate/glutamic acid: 1 mmol/L
- Histidine: 198 mmol/L
- Mannitol: 30 mmol/L
- Tryptophan: 2 mmol/L

== Clinical Application ==
HTK (branded as SERVATOR H by Global Transplant Solutions, Inc.), has been presented by industry to surgeons as an alternative solution that exceeds other cardioplegias in myocardial protection during cardiac surgery. This claim relies on the single-dose administration of HTK compared with other multidose cardioplegias (MDC), sparing time in the adjustment of equipment during cardioplegia re-administration, allowing greater time to operate and thus a decreased CPB duration. Other benefits include a lower concentration of sodium, calcium, and potassium compared with other cardioplegias with cardiac arrest arising from the deprivation of sodium. Finally, histidine is thought to aid buffering, mannitol and tryptophan to improve membrane stability, and ketoglutarate to help ATP production during reperfusion.

A 2021 meta-analysis demonstrated no statistical advantage of HTK over blood or other crystalloid cardioplegias during adult cardiac surgery. The only practical advantage of HTK, therefore, is the single-dose administration compared to multi-dose requirements of blood and other crystalloid cardioplegia.

== See also ==
- Viaspan (UW Solution)
- Biostasis
- Organ transplant
