= Aortic cross-clamp =

Instrument in heart surgery

An aortic cross-clamp is a surgical instrument used in cardiac surgery to clamp the aorta and separate the systemic circulation from the outflow of the heart.

An aortic cross-clamping procedure serves, for example, in the repairing of coarctation of the aorta. In newborns, the treatment of choice for this condition is resection and primary anastomosis. The clamping of the aorta excludes the systemic circulation, by definition, thus causing ischemia. When a long cross-clamping period (longer than 25 min) or a drop in distal aortic pressure below 50–60 mmHg is anticipated, the use of an intraoperative shunt may prevent complications such as paraplegia. A prolonged cross-clamp time is associated with worse cardiac outcomes after surgery.
