= Biostasis =

Coping with environmental changes without adapting

Biostasis is the ability of an organism to tolerate environmental changes without having to actively adapt to them. Biostasis is found in organisms that live in habitats that likely encounter unfavorable living conditions, such as drought, freezing temperatures, change in pH levels, pressure, or temperature. Insects undergo a type of dormancy to survive these conditions, called diapause. Diapause may be obligatory for these insects to survive. The insect may also be able to undergo change prior to the arrival of the initiating event.

== Microorganisms ==
Biostasis in this context is also synonymous with viable but nonculturable state. In the past when bacteria were no longer growing on culture media it was assumed that they were dead. Now we can understand that there are many instances where bacteria cells may go into biostasis or suspended animation, fail to grow on media, and on resuscitation are again culturable. VBNC state differs from 'starvation survival state' (where a cell just reduces metabolism significantly). Bacteria cells may enter the VBNC state as a result of some outside stressor such as "starvation, incubation outside the temperature range of growth, elevated osmotic concentrations (seawater), oxygen concentrations, or exposure to white light". Any of these instances could very easily mean death for the bacteria if it was not able to enter this state of dormancy. It has also been observed that in many instances where it was thought that bacteria had been destroyed (pasteurization of milk) and later caused spoilage or harmful effects to consumers because the bacteria had entered the VBNC state.

Effects on cells entering the VBNC state include "dwarfing, changes in metabolic activity, reduced nutrient transport, respiration rates and macromolecular synthesis". Yet biosynthesis continues, and shock proteins are made. Most importantly has been observed that ATP levels and generation remain high, completely contrary to dying cells which show rapid decreases in generation and retention. Changes to the cell walls of bacteria in the VBNC state have also been observed. In Escherichia coli a large amount of cross-linking was observed in the peptidoglycan. The autolytic capability was also observed to be much higher in VBNC cells than those who were in the growth state.

It is far easier to induce bacteria to the VBNC state and once bacteria cells have entered the VBNC state it is very hard to return them to a culturable state. "They examined nonculturability and resuscitation in Legionella pneumophila and while entry into this state was easily induced by nutrient starvation, resuscitation could only be demonstrated following co-incubation of the VBNC cells with the amoeba, Acanthamoeba Castellani"

Fungistasis or mycostasis a naturally occurring VBNC (viable but nonculturable) state found in fungi in soil. Watson and Ford defined fungistasis as "when viable fungal propagules, which are not subject to endogenous or constitutive dormancy do not germinate in soil at their favorable temperature or moisture conditions or growth of fungal hyphae is retarded or terminated by conditions of the soil environment other than temperature or moisture". Essentially (and mostly observed naturally occurring in soil) several types of fungi have been found to enter the VBNC state resulting from outside stressors (temperature, available nutrients, oxygen availability etc.) or from no observable stressors at all.

== Current research ==
On March 1, 2018, the Defense Advanced Research Projects Agency (DARPA) announced their new Biostasis program under the direction of Dr. Tristan McClure-Begley. The aim of the Biostasis program is to develop new possibilities for extending the golden hour in patients who suffered a traumatic injury by slowing down the human body at the cellular level, addressing the need for additional time in continuously operating biological systems faced with catastrophic, life-threatening events. By leveraging molecular biology, the program aims to control the speed at which living systems operate and figure out a way to "slow life to save life."

On March 20, 2018, the Biostasis team held a Webinar which, along with a Broad Agency Announcement (BAA), solicited five-year research proposals from outside organizations. The full proposals were due on May 22, 2018.

=== Possible approaches ===
In their Webinar, DARPA outlined a number of possible research approaches for the Biostasis project. These approaches are based on research into diapause in tardigrades and wood frogs which suggests that selective stabilization of intracellular machinery occurs at the protein level.

==== Protein chaperoning ====
In molecular biology, molecular chaperones are proteins that assist in the folding, unfolding, assembly, or disassembly of other macromolecular structures. Under typical conditions, molecular chaperones facilitate changes in shape (conformational change) of macromolecules in response to changes in environmental factors like temperature, pH, and voltage. By reducing conformational flexibility, scientists can constrain the function of certain proteins. Recent research has shown that proteins are promiscuous, or able to do jobs in addition to the ones they evolved to carry out. Additionally, protein promiscuity plays a key role in the adaptation of species to new environments. It is possible that finding a way to control conformational change in promiscuous proteins could allow scientists to induce biostasis in living organisms.

==== Intracellular crowding ====
The crowdedness of cells is a critical aspect of biological systems. Intracellular crowding refers to the fact that protein function and interaction with water is constrained when the interior of the cell is overcrowded. Intracellular organelles are either membrane-bound vesicles or membrane-less compartments that compartmentalize the cell and enable spatiotemporal control of biological reactions. By introducing these intracellular polymers to a biological system and manipulating the crowdedness of a cell, scientists may be able to slow down the rate of biological reactions in the system.

==== Tardigrade-disordered proteins ====
Tardigrades are microscopic animals that are able to enter a state of diapause and survive a remarkable array of environmental stressors, including freezing and desiccation. Research has shown that intrinsically disordered proteins in these organisms may work to stabilize cell function and protect against these extreme environmental stressors. By using peptide engineering, it is possible that scientists may be able to introduce intrinsically disordered proteins to the biological systems of larger animal organisms. This could allow larger animals to enter a state of biostasis similar to that of tardigrades under extreme biological stress.
