= Renal pathology =

Renal pathology is a subspecialty of anatomic pathology that deals with the diagnosis and characterization of medical diseases (non-tumor) of the kidneys. In the academic setting, renal pathologists work closely with nephrologists and transplant surgeons, who typically obtain diagnostic specimens via percutaneous renal biopsy. The renal pathologist must synthesize findings from light microscopy, electron microscopy, and immunofluorescence to obtain a definitive diagnosis. Medical renal diseases may affect the glomerulus, the tubules and interstitium, the vessels, or a combination of these compartments.
