= Pill Hill, Cincinnati =

Neighborhood in Ohio, United States

Coordinates: 39.140750°N 84.503987°W

Pill Hill is an informal name for a parts of several neighborhoods in uptown Cincinnati, Ohio. It is one of the city's major employment centers, with a large concentration of hospitals and other medical facilities.

== Geography ==
The informal name is most commonly associated with the northern half of Corryville, which consists of Cincinnati Children's Hospital Medical Center, the Cincinnati VA Medical Center, Holmes Hospital, Shriners Hospitals for Children – Cincinnati, and the University of Cincinnati Medical Center, as well as the University of Cincinnati College of Medicine and James L. Winkle College of Pharmacy. The neighborhood was once home to The Jewish Hospital.

Additionally, Good Samaritan Hospital in Clifton and The Christ Hospital in Mount Auburn are sometimes considered to be part of Pill Hill, as are Deaconess Hospital in Clifton Heights and Bethesda Oak Hospital in Avondale.

The neighborhood lies immediately west of the Martin Luther King Drive exit off Interstate 71 and east of the Hopple Street exit off Interstate 75. Proposals have called for the Cincinnati Bell Connector to be extended north to Pill Hill.

== History ==
The neighborhood's first hospital was the Jewish Hospital on Burnet Avenue, which was dedicated on March 30, 1890. In 1915, Cincinnati General Hospital (now the University of Cincinnati Medical Center) joined it a few blocks away in Corryville, followed by other hospitals. By the 1960s, the hospitals and university had led to heavy traffic congestion in the neighborhood. The Jewish community moved out of the surrounding neighborhoods of Mount Auburn and Avondale, eventually leading to Jewish Hospital's move to Kenwood in 1997.

In the 2000s and 2010s, more hospitals shifted investment away from Pill Hill to the fast-growing northern suburbs. TriHealth closed Bethesda Oak in 2000 in favor of Bethesda North Hospital in Montgomery. Cincinnati Children's and The Christ Hospital established full-service hospitals in Liberty Township, earning that area nicknames such as "Pill Hill North". TriHealth and Premier Health Partners also opened campuses in neighboring Warren County. Several hospitals have retained a presence on Pill Hill, anchored by University of Cincinnati medical facilities.
