= Bethesda Oak Hospital =

- Bethesda Inc.
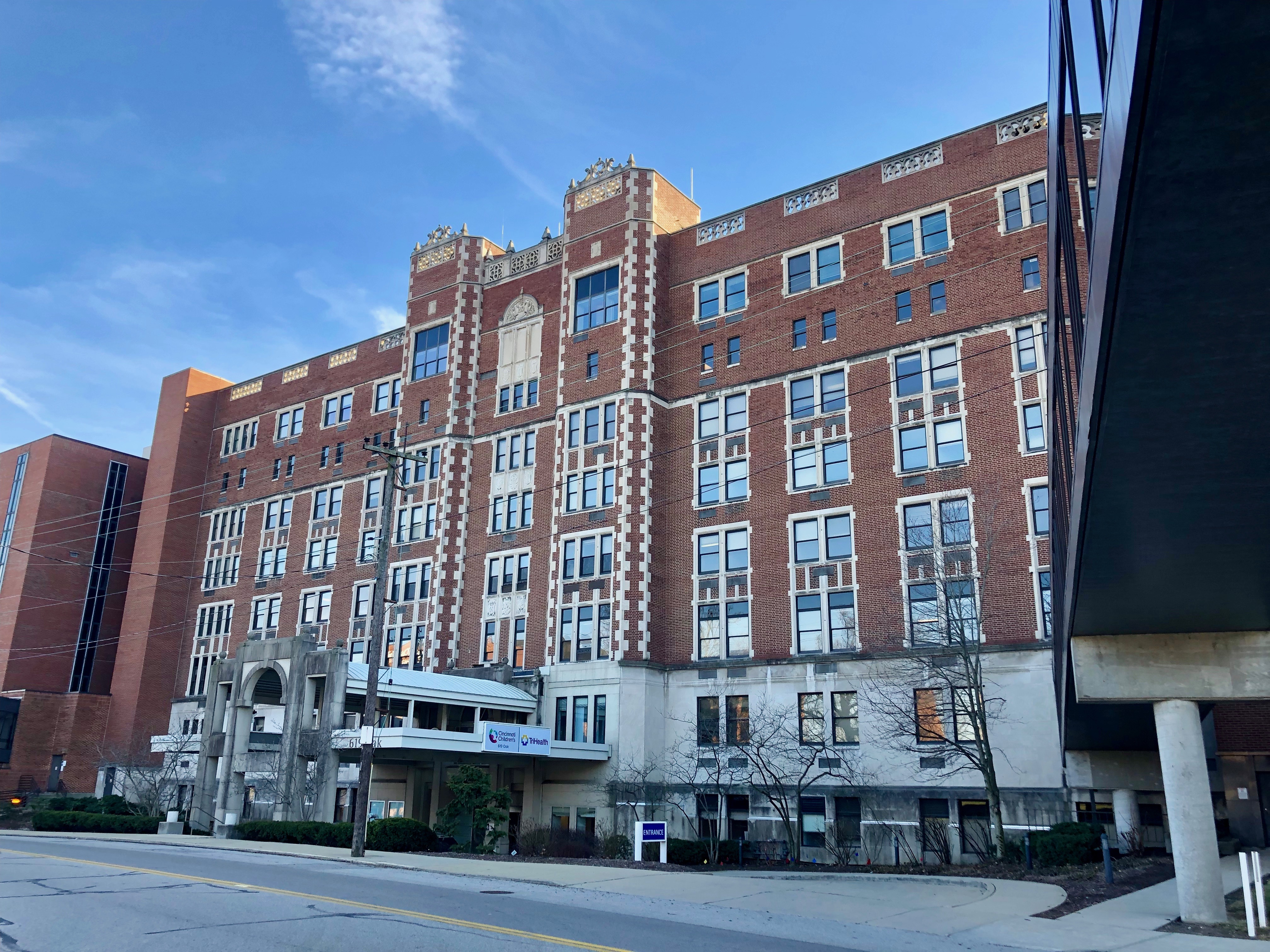
- The Oak Building in 2019.

Geography
- Location: Cincinnati, Ohio, United States
- Coordinates: 39°7′45″N 84°29′52″W

Organization
- Type: Teaching
- Network: TriHealth

Services
- Beds: 450

History
- Former name: Bethesda Hospital
- Constructed: 1897
- Opened: 1898
- Closed: February 2000
- Demolished: 2023

Links
- Lists: Hospitals in Ohio

Bethesda Oak Hospital (originally Bethesda Hospital) was a hospital in the Avondale neighborhood of Cincinnati, Ohio, United States. Built in 1897, it grew into one of the largest hospitals in the city before declining in the 1990s and closing in 2000. It was named after the Pool of Bethesda.

== Establishment ==
In 1886, seven German Methodist deaconesses moved into a small cottage in Mt. Auburn, devoting their lives to caring for the sick and the poor. Soon their overcrowded cottage became a makeshift miniature hospital. In 1898, the German Methodist Deaconess Home Association purchased the Reamy Hospital, a 20-bed private hospital operated by prominent gynecological surgeon Thaddeus A. Reamy at the corner of Oak Street and Reading Road. The Deaconnesses moved their patients to this location and renamed it Bethesda Hospital.

== Growth ==
Bethesda expanded with a new maternity hospital in 1913 and the 30-bed Marjorie Louise Strecker Hospital for Children in 1920. In 1927, Bethesda opened a 159-bed medical and surgical hospital at a cost of $1.1 million. In 1952, the Draher Residence Hall opened with a nurse dormitory and classrooms.

In 1970, Bethesda North Hospital opened in Montgomery to serve Cincinnati's rapidly growing northern suburbs. However, the original location on Oak Street continued to be the flagship hospital location of the Bethesda Hospital and Deaconess Association, which formed the nonprofit Bethesda Inc. in 1983 to oversee hospital operations. In the 1980s, Bethesda Oak added centers for cancer treatment and inpatient hospice care. At its peak in the 1980s, Bethesda Oak's 15-acre (6.1 ha) complex was home to 1.1 million square feet (10 ha) of facilities, with 450 beds and more than 1,000 employees.

== Decline and closure ==
In 1995, Bethesda Inc. partnered with Good Samaritan Hospital to form TriHealth and shifted its focus toward fiscal sponsorship of the new integrated healthcare system. By then, patient admissions had declined dramatically, leading to a string of yearly operating losses in the millions of dollars. In 1997, TriHealth announced a plan to downsize the hospital, closing its emergency department and discontinuing overnight services other than obstetrics, but modified the plan in response to outcry from doctors.

TriHealth closed Bethesda Oak in February 2000, relocating most services to Bethesda North and retaining only administrative offices and an outpatient clinic at the former hospital site. It followed the relocation of The Jewish Hospital's Avondale campus to Kenwood in 1997.

In 2002, Cincinnati Children's Hospital Medical Center purchased the Bethesda Oak site from TriHealth, which continued to lease several floors of the main Oak Building as offices. TriHealth's headquarters remained at the site until it moved to Walnut Hills in 2018. The Oak Building was vacated in July 2022 and all the structures on the site were demolished in 2023.

== See also ==
- Pill Hill, Cincinnati
