= Daniel W. Nebert =

American biomedical scientist and physician (born 1938)

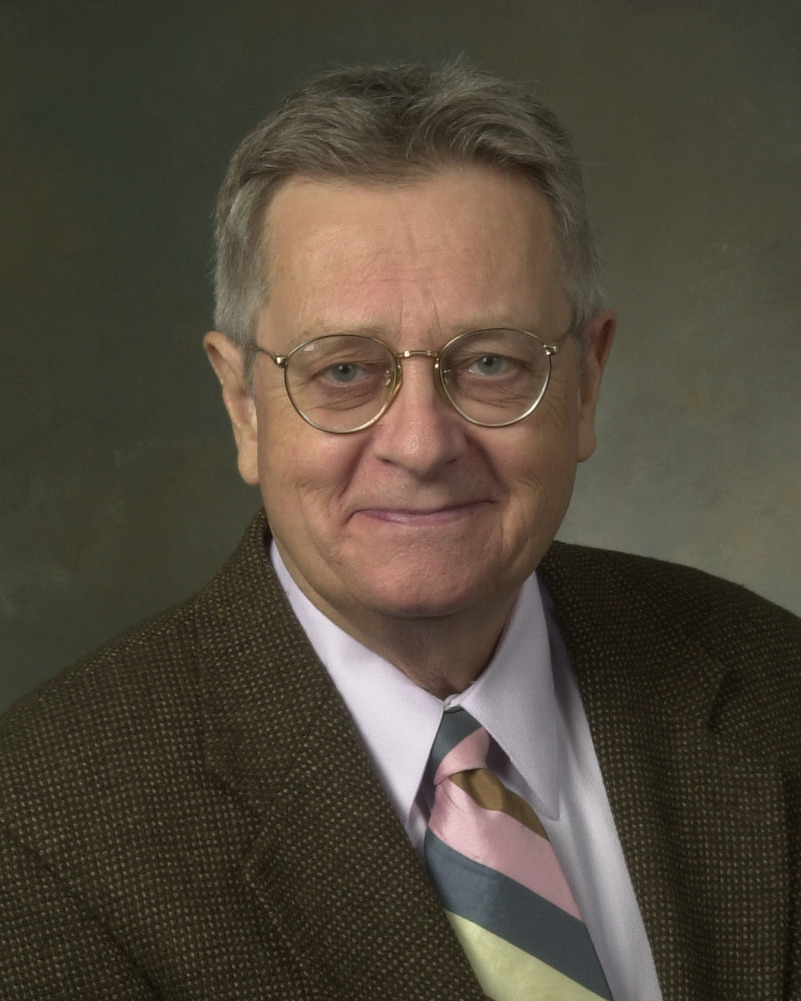
- Nebert in 2004
- Born: Portland, Oregon
- Education: Wesleyan University (BA); University of Oregon Medical School (MS, MD)
- Known for: Discovery of the basic-helix/loop/helix per-Arnt-sim (bHLH/PAS), aryl hydrocarbon receptor (AHR); Standardizing gene nomenclature system, based on evolutionary divergence; Discovery of the SLC39A8 gene encoding ZIP8 transporter of divalent cations
- Spouse: Lucia Fung Jorge
- Children: 6
- Scientific career
- Fields: Biomedical sciences, medicine
- Workplaces: National Institutes of Health; University of Cincinnati College of Medicine; Cincinnati Children's Hospital Medical Center

Daniel Walter Nebert is an American physician-scientist. He is a professor emeritus at the University of Cincinnati College of Medicine. His research has revolved around the central theme of gene–environment interactions.

== Education ==
Nebert completed a BA degree at Wesleyan University in 1960. He went on to the five-year program at the University of Oregon Medical School; he completed a MS in biophysics and an MD in 1964. Nebert had a pediatric internship and residency at the University of California, Los Angeles Health Sciences Center from 1964 to 1966. He was a postdoctoral fellow at the National Cancer Institute from 1966 to 1968.

== Career ==
Nebert moved to the NICHD in 1968. He remained there until 1989, and served as section head and the chief of the Laboratory of Developmental Pharmacology.

Nebert then moved to the University of Cincinnati Medical Center in December 1989, where he was hired as a professor of environmental health. He also had an adjunct professor title in the Human Genetics Division, Department of Pediatrics and Molecular & Developmental Biology at Cincinnati Children's Hospital Medical Center beginning in 1991. He remained at the University of Cincinnati until retiring as a professor emeritus in 2013.

Nebert has published more than 670 papers in several scientific fields. In January 2025, Nebert's Google Scholar h-index was 140 with more than 82,500 citations.

== Awards and honors ==
Nebert was elected a Fellow of the American Association for the Advancement of Science in 1994, as a member of the medical sciences section.

== Selected publications ==
- Nebert DW, Gonzalez FJ. P450 genes: structure, evolution, and regulation. Annu Rev Biochem. 1987;56:945-93. PMID: 3304150
- Zhang G, Nebert DW. Personalized medicine: Genetic risk prediction of drug response. Pharmacol Ther. 2017 Jul;175:75-90. PMID: 28213088
- Nebert DW. Aryl hydrocarbon receptor (AHR): "pioneer member" of the basic-helix/loop/helix per-Arnt-sim (bHLH/PAS) family of "sensors" of foreign and endogenous signals. Prog Lipid Res. 2017 Jul;67:38-57. PMID: 28606467
- Nebert DW, Liu Z. SLC39A8 gene encoding a metal ion transporter: discovery and bench to bedside. Hum Genomics. 2019 Sep 14;13(Suppl 1):51. PMID: 31521203
