= University of Cincinnati Health =

Healthcare system in Cincinnati, Ohio, US

Coordinates: 39°08′18″N 84°30′11″W

UC Health
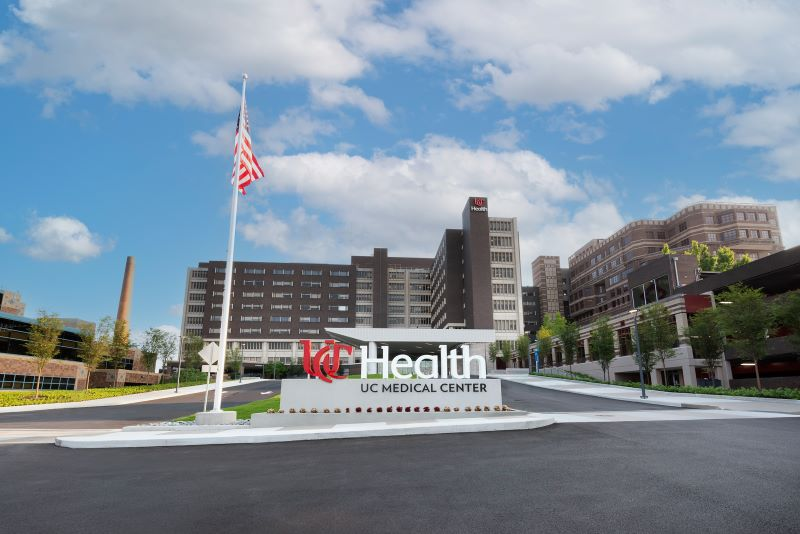
- University of Cincinnati Medical Center in Cincinnati, Ohio
- Industry: Health care
- Founded: 1819; 207 years ago
- Headquarters: Cincinnati, Ohio
- Number of locations: 40
- Area served: Greater Cincinnati Area; West Chester, Ohio; Northern Kentucky
- Key people: Cory D. Shaw (UC Health President & CEO)
- Website: uchealth.com

University of Cincinnati Health (branded as UC Health) is the healthcare system of the University of Cincinnati, in Cincinnati, Ohio. It trains health care professionals and provides research and patient care. The system is affiliated with the university via the University of Cincinnati Academic Health Center (AHC).

Most of the system's facilities are spread among two major campuses in the Cincinnati metropolitan area: the Clifton campus, home to the flagship University of Cincinnati Medical Center, and the West Chester campus, home to West Chester Hospital. There are also locations in Florence, Kentucky, and other Ohio communities.

== Locations ==
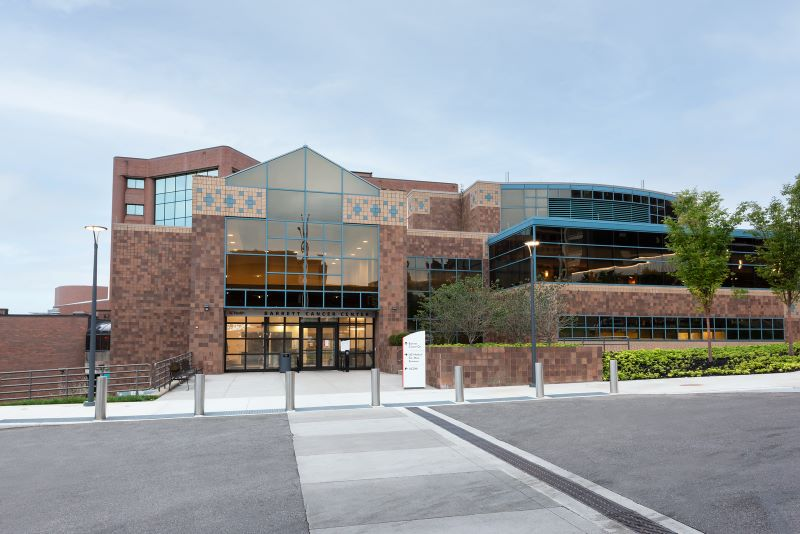
UC Health's Barrett Building, home to the University of Cincinnati Cancer Center

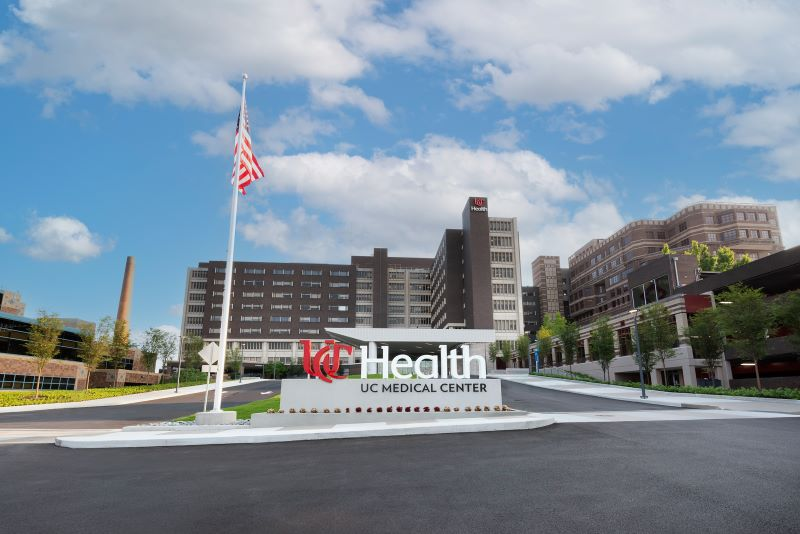
UC Health's University of Cincinnati Medical Center, located in Cincinnati, Ohio

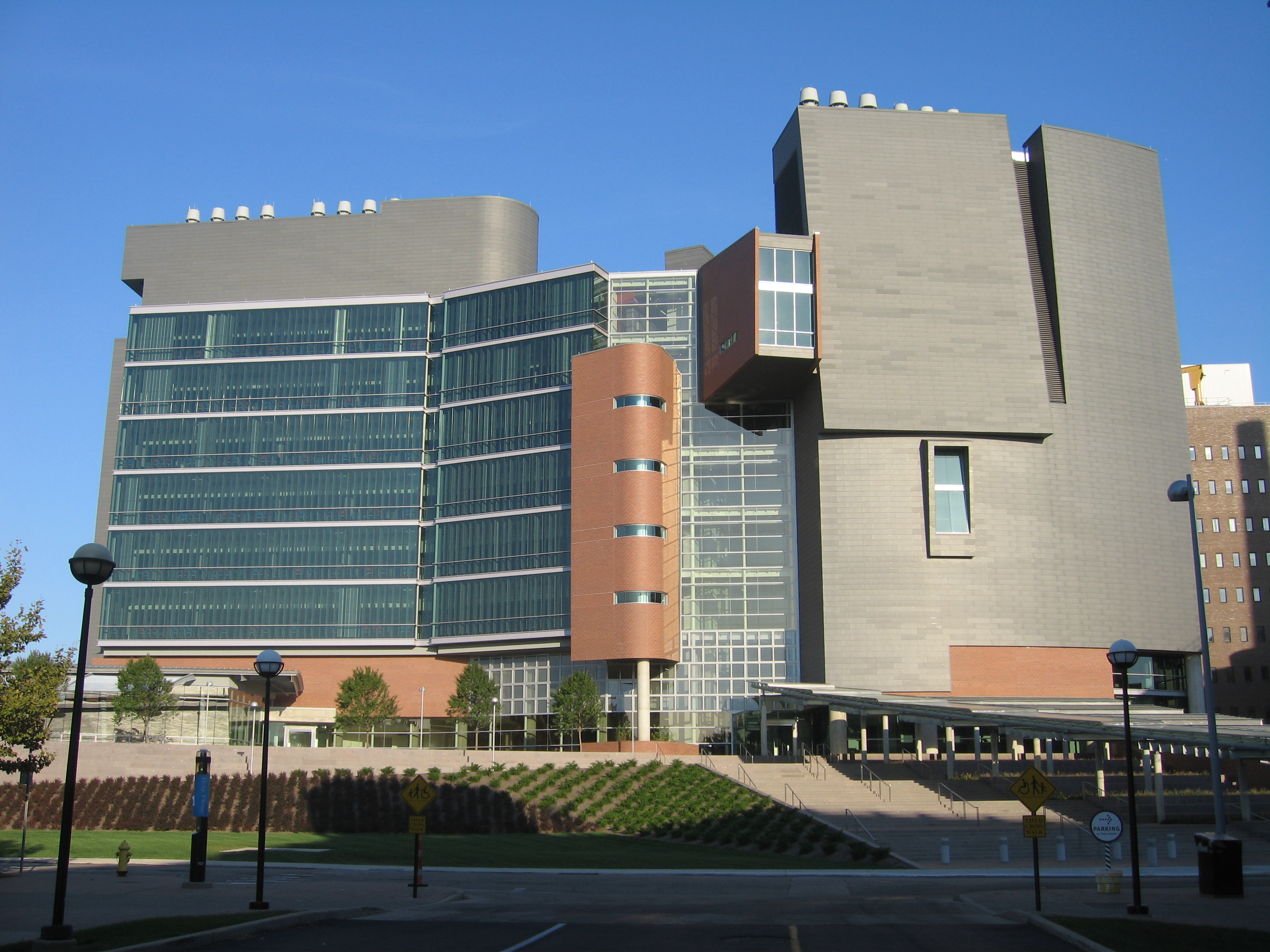
The CARE/Crawley Building (constructed in 2008), along with the adjacent Medical Sciences Building, houses the University of Cincinnati College of Medicine.

University of Cincinnati Health has locations throughout Cincinnati, West Chester, and Northern Kentucky, many of which are in the Pill Hill neighborhood of Cincinnati. Locations include:

- 7759 University Drive
- 7777 University Drive
- 7798 Discovery Drive
- Anderson Building
- Barrett Building, home to the University of Cincinnati Cancer Center
- Blood Cancer Healing Center
- Bridgeway Pointe
- Clifton Physicians Office Building
- Dental Center
- East Building
- Elizabeth Place
- Florence Building
- Holmes Building
- Hoxworth Center
- Liberty Township Building
- Lindner Center of HOPE
- Mason Building
- Midtown Building
- Milford Building
- Montgomery Building
- North Building
- Proton Therapy Center
- Radiotherapy
- Ridgeway Tower
- Rookwood Tower
- Sleep Medicine Center
- South Building
- Surgical Center
- Timothy Freeman, MD, Center for Developmental Disabilities
- Trenton Building
- Tri-County Building
- University of Cincinnati Gardner Neuroscience Institute
- UC Medical Center
- UC Medical Center Emergency Department
- Varsity Village Imaging Center
- West Building
- West Chester Hospital
- West Chester Hospital Emergency Center
- White Oak Building
- Wyoming Primary Care

== History ==
=== Early History (1819-1823) ===
Physician Daniel Drake founded the Medical College of Ohio, the precursor to the University of Cincinnati College of Medicine, in 1819. It was the first medical school west of the Allegheny Mountains. Originally located in a room above a drugstore, the college graduated its first class of 24 students in 1821.

=== Early Hospitals (1823-1869) ===
Also in 1821, Drake brought a proposal to the Ohio legislature, which approved a hospital and asylum for Cincinnati with the medical department operated by the faculty of the Medical College of Ohio. The hospital, the Commercial Hospital and Lunatic Asylum opened in 1823 at the present-day corner of 12th and Elm as a three-story brick facility that also served as an infirmary, poorhouse, and orphanage, housing roughly 250. An annex for the asylum was finished in 1827.

By 1861, the hospital was officially recognized as the Commercial Hospital of Cincinnati. By 1865, the building was ill-equipped to handle the demands prompting the building of a new hospital on the existing site in 1869. This hospital was named the Cincinnati Hospital.

In 1915, a new structure was built by the city and the hospital was renamed Cincinnati General Hospital.

In honor of the late Dr. Christian R. Holmes, Holmes Hospital was officially opened and dedicated in 1929. Holmes Hospital was a private facility in connection with Cincinnati General Hospital where doctors from the General Hospital and College of Medicine could see their private patients. It gradually transitioned into what is now part of UC Health.

=== Integration with the University (1870-1977) ===
A municipally owned college for most of its history, the University of Cincinnati became a state university on July 1, 1977. In 1982, its teaching hospital, which had been known as the General Hospital and in its present location since 1915, was renamed the University of Cincinnati Hospital. It was later renamed University Hospital, and in 2012 was renamed again as University of Cincinnati Medical Center.

=== Academic Health Center and UC Health (1980s-Present) ===
The medical school and health colleges had been referred to as the "University of Cincinnati Medical Center" from the early 1980s until 2005. In 2000 a fourth College, the College of Allied Health Sciences joined the University of Cincinnati Medical Center. In 2005, the name was changed from the University of Cincinnati Medical Center to the University of Cincinnati Academic Health Center. In 2010, the Academic Health Center (AHC) became part of the newly formed UC Health organization.

UC Health was formed after the dissolution of the Health Alliance of Greater Cincinnati, which had operated the University of Cincinnati Medical Center from 1994 to 2010 and also operated West Chester Hospital starting in 2009. The 2010 dissolution of the alliance left the university with 100% ownership so the alliance was renamed to UC Health and placed under a parent company named UC Healthcare System.

=== Pharmacy ===
Cincinnati College of Pharmacy was established as the first pharmacy college west of the Alleghenies in 1850. It operated independently until 1954, then integrated into the University of Cincinnati in 1954. In 1967, the College of Pharmacy became a unit of the University of Cincinnati Academic Health Center. On June 6, 2007, the College of Pharmacy changed its name to the James L. Winkle College of Pharmacy, for alumnus Jim Winkle. The college is only the second in UC's history to be named to honor a supporter.

=== Public Health and Clinical "Firsts" ===
Cincinnati's medical institutions achieved several national milestones in healthcare delivery:

- 1865: Launch of the United States' first ambulance service.
- 1875: Establishment of the first American professorship in laryngology.
- 1916: UC College of Nursing became the first in the U.S. to grant a Bachelor of Science in Nursing (BSN) degree.
- 1938 – Hoxworth Blood Center founded—one of America's first community blood banks.
- 1940 – American Diabetes Association founded and led by UC internist Cecil Striker, MD.
- 1970: UC established the nation's first residency program in emergency medicine.
- 1984: Launch of Air Care, one of the earliest hospital-based helicopter transport programs in the country.

=== Notable Achievements ===
Researchers and clinicians affiliated with the university have contributed numerous medical firsts and landmark discoveries:

- Heart–lung machine (1951): Three UC faculty members developed the world's first functional heart–lung machine, making open-heart surgery possible.
- Fogarty heart catheter: A major advance in vascular surgery pioneered at UC during Dr. Thomas Fogarty's fellowship training.
- Benadryl (1942): Discovered by UC chemist George Rieveschl, Benadryl became the world's first antihistamine.
- Polio vaccine: Albert Sabin developed the first live, attenuated oral polio vaccine while working jointly at UC and Cincinnati Children's Hospital Medical Center, saving millions worldwide.

Other significant contributions include definitive research on lead exposure in children, creation of one of the nation's first hematology–oncology divisions (1948), and establishment of pioneering laboratories in medical laser surgery (1961) and neurosurgical innovation (1980s).

== Academic Health Center ==
The AHC includes four colleges, as well as specialized centers:

- College of Allied Health Sciences
- College of Medicine
- College of Nursing
- James L. Winkle College of Pharmacy
- Hoxworth Blood Center
- Metabolic Diseases Institute
- Cincinnati Diabetes and Obesity Center
- UC Cancer Institute
- UC Neuroscience Institute
- UC Heart, Lung and Vascular Institute

=== Partners and affiliates ===
AHC partners with many other health care institutions.

- The Christ Hospital
- Cincinnati Children's Hospital Medical Center
- Department of Veteran Affairs Medical Center
- Good Samaritan Hospital
- The Jewish Hospital
- Mayfield Clinic
- Shriners Hospitals for Children—Cincinnati

=== College of Allied Health Sciences ===
University of Cincinnati College of Allied Health Sciences
- Established: 1998
- Dean: Tina F. Whalen, EdD
- Location: Cincinnati
- Website: http://cahs.uc.edu/

The College of Allied Health Sciences (CAHS) provides education for allied health and health science professionals. CAHS became a college at the University of Cincinnati in March 1998. Its programs originated from various colleges at the University of Cincinnati.

==== Majors and programs ====
- Doctoral
  - Communication Sciences and Disorders
    - Audiology
  - Physical Therapy
- Master's
  - Communication Sciences and Disorders
    - Speech-language Pathology
  - Genetic Counseling
  - Health Administration (in conjunction with the College of Medicine and the Lindner College of Business)
  - Nutrition Sciences
  - Transfusion and Transplantation Services
- Bachelor's
  - Advanced Medical Imaging Technology
  - Clinical Laboratory Science
  - Clinical Laboratory Science – Distance Learning
  - Communication Sciences and Disorders
  - Dietetics
  - Food and Nutrition
    - Concentration in Exercise Science
    - Concentration in Pre-Medicine
  - Health Information Management – Distance Learning
  - Health Sciences
    - Sports and Biomechanics Concentration
    - Exercise Science Concentration
- Certificate
  - Clinical Laboratory Science
  - Dietetics

School of Social Work

- Social Work

== College of Medicine ==
University of Cincinnati College of Medicine
- Established: 1819
- Dean: Gregory C. Postel, MD
- Location: Cincinnati
- Website: https://med.uc.edu/

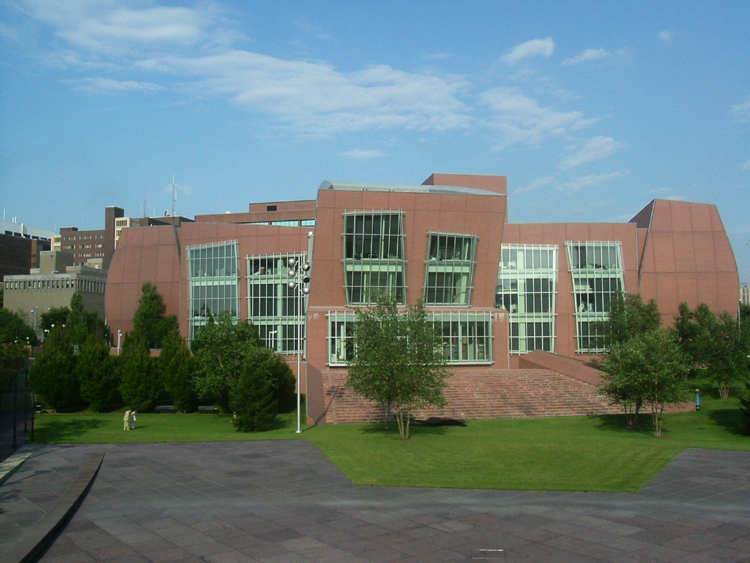
The Vontz Center for Molecular Studies, designed and built by Frank Gehry in collaboration with the BHDP Architecture company, houses the research facilities for several departments.

The College of Medicine was established by Daniel Drake in 1819 as the Medical College of Ohio, which was the first college of medicine established in the state of Ohio. It became a part of the University of Cincinnati in 1896 and is considered by some historians to be the oldest medical school west of the Allegheny Mountains. It is supposedly the second-oldest public college of medicine in the United States.

Other accomplishments include the development of the heart-lung machine, the Fogarty heart catheter, Benadryl, and the Clark oxygen electrode. The college also established the nation's first residency program in emergency medicine. The college is noted for its neurosurgical research into degenerative diseases including Alzheimer's disease and Parkinson's disease.

Ranked in the top one-third of American medical schools, the college attracts students from across the United States. In 2008, it became the first medical college in the country to implement the multiple mini interview system pioneered in Canada to better predict candidates with exceptional interpersonal skills, professionalism and ethical judgment. Other medical schools have since adopted the process. In addition to the usual application pathways, the University of Cincinnati offers a dual-admissions program known as Connections to high school students applying for undergraduate studies at the university where students are guaranteed admission to the school if they acquire the required grade point average and MCAT scores. The college attracts many undergraduate students to its summer research fellowships.

A curriculum revision effort involving more clinical instruction in the first two years of medical school was unveiled for the entering class of 2011.

In conjunction with the University of Cincinnati Medical Center, the college also sponsors 56 accredited residency and fellowship training programs through the Office of Graduate Medical Education.

=== Departments ===
- Anesthesiology
- Biomedical Informatics
- Cancer and Cell Biology
- Dermatology
- Emergency Medicine
- Environmental and Public Health Sciences
- Family and Community Medicine
- Internal Medicine
- Medical Education
- Molecular Genetics, Biochemistry, and Microbiology
- Neurology and Rehabilitation Medicine
- Neurosurgery
- Obstetrics and Gynecology
- Ophthalmology
- Orthopedic Surgery
- Otolaryngology-Head, and Neck Surgery
- Pathology and Laboratory Medicine
- Pediatrics
- Pharmacology and Systems Physiology
- Psychiatry and Behavioral Neuroscience
- Radiology
- Radiation Oncology
- Surgery

=== Degree options ===
Medical Doctor

- Doctor of Medicine (MD)

Combined/Dual Degrees

- MD/PhD (MSTP – Medical Scientist Training Program)
- MD/MBA Program
- MD/MS in Nutrition Dual Degree Program

Bachelor of Science in Medical Sciences Early Medical School Acceptance

- BS/MD (Connections Dual Admissions)
- ROSE (Research, Observation, Service, Education) Internship

Certificate Programs

- Clinical & Translational Research (Environmental Health)
- Hazardous Substances

Graduate Degrees (PhD, MS, MPH)

- Biomedical Informatics (PhD)
- Biostatistics – Environmental Health (MS, PhD)
- Cancer and Cell Biology (PhD)
- Clinical and Translational Research (MS)
- Epidemiology (MS, PhD)
- Genetic Counseling (MS)
- Immunobiology (MS, PhD)
- Industrial Hygiene (MS, PhD)
- Molecular and Developmental Biology (PhD)
- Molecular Genetics, Biochemistry and Microbiology (MS, PhD)
- Molecular, Cellular and Biochemical Pharmacology (PhD)

Graduate Degrees (PhD, MS, MPH) contd.

- Neuroscience/Medical Sciences Scholars Interdisciplinary (PhD)
- Occupational Medicine (MS)
- Occupational Safety and Ergonomics (MS, PhD)
- Pathobiology and Molecular Medicine (PhD)
- Physiology (MS)
- Public Health (MPH)
- Radiological Sciences/Medical Physics (MS)
- Systems Biology and Physiology (PhD)
- Toxicology (PhD)

=== Centers of Excellence ===
- UC Cancer Center
- UC Diabetes and Metabolic Disease Institute
- UC Heart, Lung and Vascular Institute
- UC Gardner Neuroscience Institute

=== Rankings ===
In 2022 U.S. News & World Report magazine ranked the University of Cincinnati College of Medicine as tied for 42nd best medical school nationally in research and (also tied) 59th in primary care. In addition, the College of Medicine had the third best pediatrics program in the country according to the same report.

=== Notable alumni and faculty ===
- John Shaw Billings - began process to organize world's medical literature, now PubMed
- Gerald Buckberg - an American physician whose research interests centered in the area of myocardial protection and led to the introduction of blood cardioplegia
- Tommy Casanova - American physician, football player and politician
- M. H. Cleary - American lawyer, physician and activist
- Robin T. Cotton - English physician who is well known for his work in pediatric otolaryngology
- William W. Ellsberry - U.S. Representative from Ohio
- Thomas J. Fogarty - an American surgeon and medical device inventor best known for the invention of the embolectomy catheter, or balloon catheter
- Alonzo Garcelon - the 36th Governor of Maine, and a surgeon general of Maine during the American Civil War
- Marilyn Gaston - expert on sickle-cell disease
- Bertha Lund Glaeser (1862–1939) – American physician
- Jack Horsley - American former competition swimmer and Olympic medalist
- Frank F. Ledford Jr. an American orthopedic surgeon who served as the 37th Surgeon General of the United States Army
- Jeanne Lusher - an American physician, pediatric hematologist/oncologist, and a researcher in the field of bleeding disorders of childhood
- Anna Ornstein - Auschwitz survivor, psychoanalyst and psychiatrist, author, speaker, and scholar
- Scott L. Pomeroy - the Bronson Crothers Professor of Neurology and Director of the Intellectual and Developmental Disabilities Research Center of Harvard Medical School
- James B. Preston - an American born neurophysiologist whose research was fundamental to discovering how our brains control movement
- Scott L. Rauch - President and Psychiatrist in Chief of McLean Hospital and Professor at Harvard Medical School
- Clarice Reid - an American pediatrician who led the National Sickle Cell Disease Program at the U.S. National Heart, Lung, and Blood Institute at the National Institutes of Health
- Albert Sabin - credited with developing the polio vaccine
- Alejandro Sánchez Alvarado - a molecular biologist, an investigator of the Howard Hughes Medical Institute, and Scientific Director of the Stowers Institute for Medical Research
- Steven Seifert - Medical toxicologist
- John McLellan Tew - Neurosurgeon and author
- Carey A. Trimble - U.S. Representative from Ohio

=== College of Nursing ===
University of Cincinnati College of Nursing
- Established: 1889
- Dean: Greer Glazer, PhD
- Location: Cincinnati
- Website: http://nursing.uc.edu/

Established in 1889, the University of Cincinnati College of Nursing was the first school to offer a baccalaureate degree in nursing in 1916. In 1942, the college became a charter member of the National League for Nursing. In 2002 the college was the first nursing school to offer cooperative education in addition to clinical time, and in 2010 it began a Doctorate of Nursing Practice. Successes include awarding over $1.0 million in scholarships and graduate assistantship stipends for the 2008 – 2009 academic year, ranking in the top 10 percent of American nursing programs, receiving over $2.6 million in extramural research awards during the 2009 fiscal year and developing partnerships with over 300 clinical sites.

In 1982, the college was one of eleven nursing schools that received the Robert Wood Johnson Teaching Nursing Home Project Grant. In 1987, IBM chose the college as one of fifteen to develop computer-assisted interactive video for health sciences. A nursing doctoral program and nurse anesthetist master's program were established in 1990. In 1992, the college established a joint master's degree (MSN/MBA) with the Lindner College of Business.

==== Centers ====
- Aging with Dignity
- Wedbush Centre
- CATER
- Nightingale Awards
- Institute for Nursing Research and Scholarship

=== James L. Winkle College of Pharmacy ===
University of Cincinnati James L. Winkle College of Pharmacy
- Established: 1850
- Dean: Christopher Surratt, PhD
- Location: Cincinnati
- Website: http://pharmacy.uc.edu/

The College of Pharmacy is one of the oldest in the United States, and the oldest west of the Allegheny Mountains. It offers PharmD, MS and PhD degrees, including some online programs. Its graduates have a 100% placement rate prior to graduation. It is ranked in the top 25% of pharmacy programs in the US.

==== History ====
The Cincinnati College of Pharmacy was chartered by the Ohio Legislature in 1850 and it was the first pharmacy school west of the Allegheny Mountains. It operated as a private college until July 1954 when it became an integral part of the University of Cincinnati.

The college is named based on Jim Winkle's pledge of $10 million from his estate or trust. A Hamilton, Ohio, resident who graduated from the college in 1958.

The college occupies newly remodeled research space in the Medical Sciences Building and was renovated in 2017. That space includes new classrooms, teaching labs, student club meeting space, faculty and staff offices, conference rooms and an IT help desk.

==== Programs ====
The college offers multiple degree curricula, including Masters, PhD, and PharmD. It also offers online MS degree or certificate programs in cosmetic science, drug development and pharmacy leadership. Postgraduate residency (PGY-1) training opportunities in community pharmacy for PharmD graduates are available. A continuing education program exists to help enhance the skills of practicing pharmacists and pharmacy technicians.

===== Doctor of Pharmacy (PharmD) =====
The Doctor of Pharmacy Degree is the only entry-level professional degree offered by the college. The program is fully accredited by the Accreditation Council for Pharmacy Education. Graduates are eligible to sit for the North American Pharmacist Licensure Examination (NAPLEX). Approximately 97 students are enrolled into each class.

The Doctor of Pharmacy curriculum is divided into the following:

- At least three years of Pre-Pharmacy Education
- Four years of Professional Pharmacy Education

The PharmD professional degree program has been recognized by ACPE (Accreditation Council for Pharmacy Education) with special commendation in the areas of student affairs, curricular development and assessment and clinical experiential education.

===== Full-time MS/PHD programs =====
Students interested in obtaining a full-time research-based MS or PhD degree in Pharmaceutical Sciences generate innovative research findings under the guidance of a program training faculty with funded research activities.

Applicant selection is competitive. MS and PhD research programs focus on one of three areas: biomembrane science, experimental therapeutics, and health outcomes.

====== Graduate programs in drug development ======
The MS program with drug development specialization (MSDD) is a two-year, online degree program in global pharmaceutical development (drugs/biologicals, drug products and devices). Tailored to meet the aspirations of working professionals, the program can be completed on a part-time basis with coursework offered on-site in the evening on weekdays or via distance learning.

A collaboration between academia, industry, and government, MSDD provides cross-disciplinary training in the scientific, regulatory and business aspects of drug development.

====== Graduate programs in cosmetic science ======
The interdisciplinary cosmetic science programs provide opportunities to develop professional skills and fundamental concepts driving cosmetic science.

Started in 1973, the college's MS in Cosmetic Science is one of the oldest such graduate programs in the world. The Graduate programs in cosmetic science are as follows:

- Capstone Project MS degree: MS degree in pharmaceutical sciences with emphasis in cosmetic science (30 credit hours)
- Graduate Certificate (GC) in Cosmetic Science: 12 credit hours covering skin and hair science as well as formulation science
- MS and PhD degrees: intensive research-based MS and PhD degrees in pharmaceutical science with emphasis in cosmetic science (on-site at Cincinnati)
- Courses for non-matriculated students: Online courses are available to non-matriculated students who have not applied for acceptance into the GC or MS Programs (a maximum of six (6) semester credit hours may be transferred to either program upon matriculation).

The graduate programs in cosmetic science grew from 17 students in 2013 to 96 students in 2017.

====== Master's degree and Graduate Certificate Programs in Pharmacy Leadership ======
In 2016, the college became the first pharmacy school in the US to offer an online MS degree program and graduate certificate in pharmacy leadership.

These programs combine leadership and professional development in health care business and management courses.

These are the first programs at the university to be a partnership between three difference colleges:

- James L. Winkle College of Pharmacy
- Linder College of Business - Masters in Business Administration
- College of Allied Health - Masters in Health Administration

The programs are organized as preparation for leadership in settings such as independent and chain community pharmacies, health-system inpatient, outpatient and clinical pharmacies, clinical coordinator roles, managed care, industry, long-term care.

==== Growth ====
From 2014 to 2016, the college completed the largest hire of new faculty in the history of the college. Many of these new hires were in partnerships with healthcare organizations in the greater Cincinnati area. Research funding at the college increased, with 51% growth from 2015 to 2016 reaching a total of $8.9 million in 2016
