= Thomas J. Fogarty =

American surgeon and inventor (1934–2025)

- Born: Thomas James Fogerty; February 25, 1934; Cincinnati, Ohio, U.S.
- Died: December 28, 2025 (aged 91); Los Altos, California, U.S.
- Known for: Inventing, winemaking
- Notable work: Hancock Aortic Tissue Valve

Thomas James Fogarty (February 25, 1934 – December 28, 2025) was an American surgeon and medical device inventor. He is best known for the invention of the embolectomy catheter (or balloon catheter), which revolutionized the treatment of blood clots (emboli).

In 2008, Fogarty was elected a member of the National Academy of Engineering for invention of the balloon catheter and devices that have revolutionized vascular surgery, and for creating companies to commercialize these inventions.

== Early life and education ==
Fogarty was born in Cincinnati, Ohio, on February 25, 1934, into an Irish-Catholic family. His father worked as a railroad engineer, but died when Fogarty was eight years old.

Fogarty cited his father's absence as being influential in his own creative nature as an inventor. Fogarty fixed things that needed to be fixed for his mother, and he worked with soapbox derby cars and model airplanes. He recalled, "I just had a natural inclination and inquisitive nature about building things. I looked at things and just naturally thought, 'Okay, how can I make this better?'" His business side was evident in childhood as well. The model airplanes that he built were sold to neighborhood kids. When he became frustrated with motor scooter gears, he built and sold a centrifugal clutch.

Fogarty was not a good student; his original career goal was to be a boxer. He recalled, "I wasn't a very good kid. They sent me to a camp to keep me out of trouble. One of the routine activities was boxing."

To help his family get by in the late 1940s, Fogarty started working at Good Samaritan Hospital, beginning with cleaning medical equipment while he was in the eighth grade at school. He continued working during his high school summer vacations and was soon promoted to scrub technician, a person who handed medical instruments to surgeons – he witnessed his first surgery at a young age. It was during this time that he first met Dr. Jack Cranley, who would have a major influence on Fogarty's future career.

During his last year of high school, Fogarty discovered that he wanted to be a doctor. At the age of 17, he quit his boxing career after he broke his nose in a match that ended in a draw. A family priest gave him a recommendation, and because of his awful grades, he was admitted to Cincinnati's Xavier University on probation. Jack Cranley, one of the most prominent vascular surgeons in the United States became his mentor. Speaking of Cranley, Fogarty later stated: "I had a mentor who encouraged me and helped to persuade me to go to college… He had 10 kids and I became the 11th. He always told me, 'You are smarter than you think.'"

Fogarty graduated from Xavier University with a bachelor’s degree in biology in 1956 and went on to attend the University of Cincinnati College of Medicine, where he graduated summa cum laude in 1960. From 1960 to 1961, he interned at the University of Oregon Medical School in Portland, Oregon, and he completed his surgical residency at the same school in 1965.

== Invention of the embolectomy catheter ==
During Fogarty's years at Good Samaritan Hospital, he witnessed the deaths of many patients who died from complications in blood clot surgeries in their limbs. He recalled, "Fifty percent of the patients died. I thought there must be a better way." Before Fogarty's invention, surgeons had to use forceps to remove the blood clots only after a huge part of an artery had been cut open, and the patient would be under general anesthesia for hours. Blood flow is usually interrupted in the procedure, increasing the risk of the patient losing a limb.

At home, the ideas that went through Fogarty's head concerned different ways of making the procedure better, and he especially concentrated on avoiding the risky incisions. He tinkered with a urethral catheter and a balloon in his attic. Because a catheter required only a small incision, it would be able to get to the clot without much trauma to the patient. The urethral catheter is also flexible yet strong enough to be pushed through a blood clot. As for the balloon, he basically cut off the tip of the pinky finger of a size 5 surgical latex glove and attempted to incorporate it onto the end of the catheter. The resulting balloon could be inflated with saline using a syringe, and once it expands to the size of the artery, it is then retracted, withdrawing the clot through the artery and out the incision.

The main problem in building this device was the way the balloon could be attached to the catheter. Glue that could hold vinyl, the material making up a catheter, and latex, the type of glove used, was not available. Fogarty's own take on the catheter came about because of fishing techniques he learned as a child. Precise hand-tying was needed in fly-fishing, and with these techniques, he tied the balloon to the catheter. "I'd always tied flies and made lures so it was just a natural thing." His experimental balloon catheter, however, always seemed to burst when it was over inflated. It even broke when he dragged it through glass tubes filled with Jell-o, a model he thought simulated a clot within an artery. After some time, he figured out the type and thickness of rubber that was firm enough when inflated to extract a clot and still flexible enough to move through without breaking. The device, made before Fogarty even received his MD from University of Cincinnati in 1960, became the first minimally invasive surgical device.

Fogarty, however, came across difficulties in getting a manufacturer to produce it. From 1959 to 1961, nobody was willing to help. "Companies thought I was some stooge fooling around. I didn't have any credibility", recalled Fogarty, noting that experienced surgeons attributed his naive idea to his inexperience as a low-ranking medical student. Dr. Cranley continued to encourage him, and soon, during his fellowship training at the University of Cincinnati in 1961 and 1962, Fogarty started to make the catheter system by hand for himself and for other vascular surgeons.

At the University of Oregon, while Fogarty was completing his residency in surgery, Dr. Al Starr, head of the cardiothoracic division, used Fogarty's balloon catheters. After he was informed that no company was willing to manufacture Fogarty's device, he asked one of his acquaintances, Lowell Edwards, an electrical engineer and president of his own company, to give the device consideration in producing it. In 1969, Fogarty patented his device, and Edwards Life Sciences from Irvine, California, was assigned the patent to begin manufacturing the Fogarty embolectomy catheter.

Because of the decreased risk associated with the device, Fogarty's balloon catheter became the industry standard and remains the most widely used catheter for blood-clot removal. Before his invention the success rate for removing an embolus, or blood clot, was 40-50%. As of 2012, the balloon catheter was used in around 300,000 procedures a year, and was estimated to have saved the lives and limbs of over twenty million patients.

== Other inventions ==
Numerous sequel applications of Fogarty's catheter came about. The first balloon angioplasty, for example, was performed with a Fogarty catheter in 1965, and has led to over six hundred fifty thousand such operations per year. Fogarty has also modified his catheter to less invasive biopsy techniques.

After completing his residency and becoming a cardiovascular surgeon, Fogarty continued to invent new medical devices. One of his most successful products is the Stent-Graft, which dealt with the difficult problem of abdominal aortic aneurysms (a term referring to a weakened blood vessel). The old method was to remove the bad part of a weakened blood vessel, but Fogarty's idea was to support it with an implant. He used a stent, a thin polyester tube that grabs onto the blood vessels. A catheter transports the stent to the weakened blood vessel, and once the balloon is inflated, the stent expands to the size of the blood vessel, and blood flows normally.

Fogarty's other inventions include Fogarty surgical clips and clamps, which are used by cardiac and vascular surgeons to temporarily occlude (close down) blood vessels during surgery. Working with Warren Hancock, he is co-inventor of the Hancock tissue heart valve – the world's first porcine valve.

Fogarty's own inventions and the many others that resulted from his original embolectomy catheter heavily influenced the way surgery was performed. Considered one of the pioneers of minimally-invasive surgery, Fogarty has said: "I had no concept that [non-invasive surgery] would reach the magnitude that it has."

As a result of the embolectomy catheter and other inventions, Dr. Fogarty won many prizes, including the Presidential National Medal of Technology and Innovation, the country's highest honor for achievement and leadership in advancing the fields of science and technology, in 2014; the National Medal for Technology and Innovation in 2012; and a Lifetime Achievement Award from the Advanced Medical Technology Association (AdvaMed) in 2015. He published around 180 scientific articles and textbook chapters in the fields of general and cardiovascular surgery. He served as president of the Society for Vascular Surgery from 1995 to 1996.

== Innovation and entrepreneurship ==
Fogarty founded Fogarty Engineering, Inc. in 1980, to promote ideas for new medical devices, and has founded/co-founded and chaired the board for many business and research companies based on devices developed at the company.

In 1993, with Mark Wan and Wilfred Jaeger, he founded Three Arch Partners, a venture capital fund to invest in new technology and medical devices.

As a pioneer and supporter of innovation in medical technology, Fogarty acquired over 190 patents for his medical work. He was associated with numerous medical technology companies and was appointed as an independent director to the Board of Pulse Biosciences in 2017. He was also a managing director of early-stage life science accelerator Emergent Medical Partners.

=== Fogarty Innovation ===
Fogarty left Stanford Medical School after about 14 years as a professor and practicing cardiovascular surgeon. In September 2007, at Mountain View, California, he founded Fogarty Innovation (previously known as the Fogarty Institute for Innovation) to spur medical device innovation. The idea for the incubator dates back to Fogarty's early life when he was mentored and encouraged by Dr. Jack Cranley. Fogarty stated:

We are teaching people (doctors and engineers) how to get their concepts and products into use. Very few have gone through the process of coming up with a concept and getting it funded. That does not come naturally. It comes through experience. We will teach how to address these challenges.

== Thomas Fogarty Winery and Vineyards ==
In 1969, when he began teaching surgery at the Stanford University Medical Center, Fogarty was first introduced to wine. He helped out at a Stanford colleague's small winery. Later on, he purchased land in the Santa Cruz Mountains. He established a cellar there and began making wine with grapes bought from nearby growers. With help from founding winemaker Michael Martella, he planted his first vines in 1978 and set up a commercial winery, Thomas Fogarty Winery and Vineyards, in 1981, largely in order to share a business with his family. The estate now has thirty acres under vine, which are farmed organically.

The winery is run today by Tom Fogarty, Jr. and the Fogarty family with production overseen by Winegrower Nathan Kandler. It has become well known as a top producer of single-vineyard Pinot Noir and Chardonnay wines. Thomas Fogarty Winery was named by Wine and Spirits magazine as one of its top 100 wineries in 2014.

== Death ==
Fogarty died at his home in Los Altos, California, on December 28, 2025, at the age of 91.

== Awards ==
- Distinguished Scientific Presentations, American College of Surgeons, 1971, 1973, 1975, 1981
- Inventor of the Year, San Francisco Patent and Trademark Association, 1980
- Honorary Doctorate, Xavier University, 1987
- Lemelson-MIT Prize, 2000
- AAMI Foundation Laufman-Greatbatch Prize, 2000
- National Inventors Hall of Fame, 2001
- Medical Design Excellence Awards Lifetime Achievement Award, 2012
- National Medal of Technology and Innovation, 2012
- AdvaMed Lifetime Achievement Award, 2015

== Affiliated organizations ==
- American Association for Thoracic Surgery
- American College of Surgeons, Fellow
- American Surgical Association
- International Society for Cardiovascular Surgery-North American Chapter
- International Society of Endovascular Specialists
- National Academy of Engineering, Member
- Pacific Coast Surgical Association
- Society for Clinical Vascular Surgery
- Society of Thoracic Surgeons
- Society for Vascular Surgery
- Society of Vascular Technology
- Western Thoracic Surgical Society

== Selected patents ==
- Fogarty, U.S. Patent 3,435,826, “Embolectomy Catheter”
- Fogarty, U.S. Patent 3,880,166, “Vessel Occluder”
- Fogarty, U.S. Patent 4,643,194, “Flexible calibrator”
- Fogarty, U.S. Patent 4,774,949, “Deflector guiding catheter”
- Fogarty, U.S. Patent 4,821,719, “Cohesive-adhesive atraumatic clamp”
