= Marilyn Gaston =

American physician

- Born: January 31, 1939 (age 87); Cincinnati, Ohio, US
- Other names: Marilyn Hughes Gaston
- Occupation: physician
- Known for: sickle cell disease research

Marilyn Hughes Gaston (born 31 January 1939) is a physician and researcher. She was the first black woman to direct the Bureau of Primary Health Care in the U.S. Health Resources and Services Administration. She is most famous for her work studying sickle cell disease (SCD).

== Early life ==
Marilyn Hughes Gaston was born in 1939 in Cincinnati, Ohio. Gaston first graduated from Miami University in 1960 before she graduated from medical school at the University of Cincinnati College of Medicine in 1964 where she then pursued her path in pediatric medicine. She was the only woman of six and the only African American in her graduating class. She finished her internship at Philadelphia General Hospital and completed her residency years in pediatric medicine at the Children’s Hospital Medical Center. During Gaston’s childhood years, her family's poor financial status discouraged her efforts to become a doctor. Although, Gaston never let the fact that she was black, poor and a woman, keep her from following her dreams for becoming a doctor.

== Family and personal life ==
While growing up in Cincinnati, Ohio, she lived in a three-room apartment in the public housing projects with her younger and older half-brother. Growing up money was very tight and at a frightening level to provide for her whole family. Gaston’s father, Myron Hughes, worked as a waiter while her mother, Dorothy Hughes, a Medical secretary. Even, her family did not have what a normal family would have, she wanted to ensure people that her childhood was filled with laughter and love. She received little encouragement to follow her dreams of becoming a doctor because it would be a slim chance for her since her family would not be able to financially send and support her through medical school. One of the main reasons that Gaston wanted to become a doctor was because her mother Dorothy Hughes suffered from Cervical cancer with no access to health insurance. Her family's poverty inspired Gaston to be committed to public health.

Gaston also worked to bring affordable health care to impoverished families and was the first black woman to direct a public health service bureau (Bureau of Primary Health Care in the U.S. Health Resources and Services Administration) of the Health Resources and Services Administration (HRSA). Through this program, with only a 5-million-dollar budget, she was able to bring impoverished families the opportunity to have access to medical workers, medical supplies, and the facilities that an average American is guaranteed. The program also granted medical care to elders, pregnant women, and new immigrants.

Gaston received many awards in her lifetime, including the National Medical Association (NMA’s) Lifetime Achievement Award, every honor awarded by the Public Health Service, and even has Marilyn Hughes Gaston Day celebrated each year in Cincinnati and in Lincoln Heights, Ohio.

== Work on sickle cell disease ==
While completing her internship at Philadelphia General Hospital she found her interest in studying more about sickle cell disease when a baby was admitted into the emergency room. This child had a severely swollen hand and no detection of trauma. Gaston was told to run a blood test to check for sickle cell disease, which came back positive. The thought of running a blood test for sickle cell disease had never occurred to her, so she became committed to learning all she could about this disease by working with the National Institutes for Health. While proceeding with her study she discovered a revolutionary medical procedure in 1986 that would change the lives of infants that suffer from this disease. She found from her study that children need to be screened to see if they have this disease during their infant years, because if the child does test positive then by the time the child reaches four months of age, they need to start prophylactic therapy while taking penicillin administered orally. By taking penicillin it proves that it can prevent septic infection. This resulted in legislation by Congress for early SCD screenings, so treatment can begin right away.
