= Scott L. Rauch =

American psychiatrist

Scott Laurence Rauch (born September 22, 1960) is currently the inaugural Trustees’ Endowed Chair for Innovation in Psychiatry at McLean Hospital, and a professor of psychiatry at Harvard Medical School. He is also the immediate past [emeritus] president, psychiatrist in chief, and Rose-Marie & Eijk van Otterloo Chair of Psychiatry for McLean Hospital as well as immediate past [emeritus] chair of Behavioral & Mental Health for Mass General Brigham.

Dr. Rauch is a member of the National Academy of Medicine, as well as past president and current secretary of the Society of Biological Psychiatry. He has also served in leadership roles for the Anxiety and Depression Association of America as well as the National Network of Depression Center s.

His principal research interests relate to neuroimaging and the neurobiology of affective disorders. Dr. Rauch and colleagues have been leaders in delineating the neurocircuitry of anxiety disorders as well as pioneers in using modern technology, including brain stimulation, neurosurgery, and internet-based methods, to develop novel treatments for anxiety and mood disorders. Dr. Rauch has won numerous awards for his mentorship and research accomplishments, including from Harvard Medical School, the American Psychiatric Association, and the American College of Neuropsychopharmacology.

He was associate chief of psychiatry for neuroscience research at Massachusetts General Hospital, where he was the founding director of the Psychiatric Neuroimaging Research Program and the MGH Division of Psychiatric Neuroscience Research and Neurotherapeutics.

== Education ==
- 1982 BA in neuroscience, Amherst College
- 1987 MD, University of Cincinnati College of Medicine

== Leadership ==
Scott L. Rauch, MD, served as president and Psychiatrist in Chief of McLean Hospital from 2006 to 2025. During his 19-year tenure, he oversaw a period of significant growth in clinical care, research, education, and global public engagement in mental health.

Rauch's leadership was marked by major expansion of McLean's clinical services across inpatient, residential, and outpatient levels of care, including new and specialized programs for adolescents, young adults, and adults. He guided the development of new clinical sites and partnerships throughout Massachusetts and beyond, strengthening McLean's regional, national, and international footprint.

Under his oversight, McLean advanced its standing as a leading psychiatric research institution and was consistently named one of the top psychiatric hospitals in the United States for more than two decades. He supported the enhancement of the hospital's research infrastructure, fostered interdisciplinary collaboration, and helped attract federal and philanthropic investment that expanded neuroscience and translational research capacity.

Rauch prioritized education and training as central to the hospital's mission, growing McLean's role in psychiatry and psychology education and broadening professional and public mental health education programs. During his tenure, McLean's digital and community outreach efforts significantly expanded, including global mental health initiatives such as the Deconstructing Stigma campaign, which aimed to reduce stigma through storytelling and public awareness.

Under Rauch's leadership, McLean Hospital engaged in a successful $225 million fundraising campaign that will conclude at the end of 2025. Funds raised will go toward raising the standards of mental health care, with an emphasis on the unmet needs of young people and women. Among the initiatives supported by this campaign is the development of a new Child and Adolescent Campus to modernize care environments and meet rising demand for youth mental health services.

Rauch transitioned from his role as president and psychiatrist in chief in November 2025, concluding one of the longest and most transformative presidencies in McLean Hospital's history.

== Publications ==
=== Books ===
- Miguel EC, Rauch SL, Leckman JF, eds. Neuropsychiatry of the basal ganglia. Psychiatric Clinics of North America. Philadelphia: W.B. Saunders, 1997.
- Dougherty DD, Rauch SL, eds. Psychiatric neuroimaging research: contemporary strategies. Washington, DC: American Psychiatric Publishing, Inc., 2001.
- Dougherty DD, Rauch SL, Rosenbaum JF, eds. Essentials of neuroimaging for clinical practice. Washington, DC: American Psychiatric Publishing, Inc., 2004.
- Zald DH, Rauch SL, eds. The orbitofrontal cortex. Oxford: Oxford University Press, 2006.
- Stern TA, Rosenbaum JF, Fava M, Biederman J, Rauch SL, eds. Comprehensive clinical psychiatry. Philadelphia: Mosby-Elsevier, 2008.
- Camprodon J, Rauch SL, Greenberg BD, Dougherty DD, eds. Psychiatric neurotherapeutics: contemporary surgical and device-based treatments. New York: Humana Press, 2015.
