= John McLellan Tew =

American neurosurgeon

John McLellan Tew, Jr.
- Born: May 18, 1936 (age 90); Linden, North Carolina, USA
- Education: Wake Forest University
- Occupation: Neurosurgeon
- Known for: Neurosurgery research and treatments
- Spouse: Susan Smyth Tew

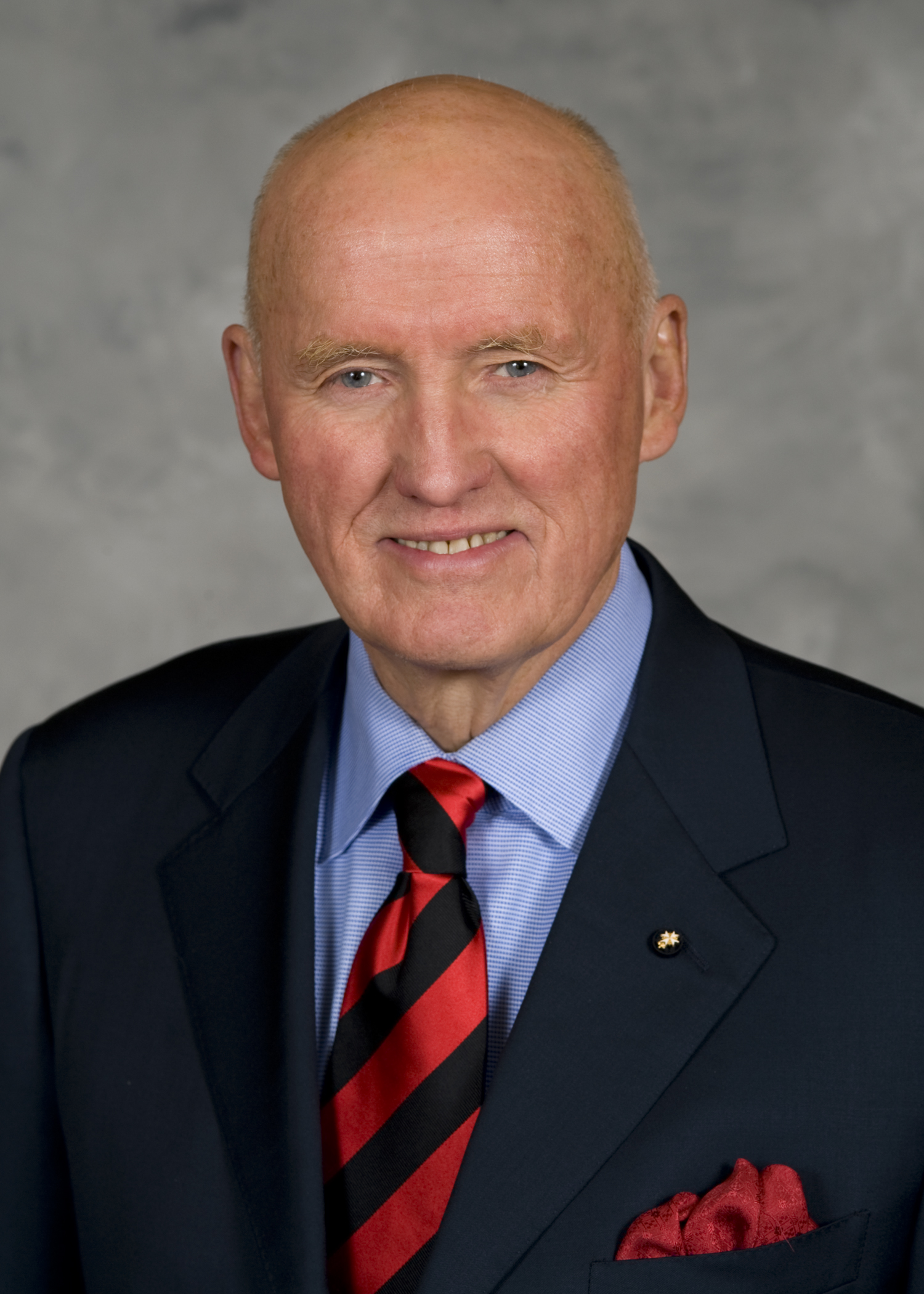

John McLellan Tew, Jr. (born May 18, 1936) is an American neurosurgery specialist. He served as president of several American neurosurgical organizations, co-authored four neurosurgical textbooks, and trained more than 60 neurosurgical residents.

== Early life and education ==
Born in Linden, North Carolina, Tew grew up on a farm where, while helping care for livestock, he learned his first surgical skills from his grandfather. Encouraged by his mother, who was unable to attend college, and his father, who was unable to finish high school, Dr. Tew dreamed of a world beyond the farm and enrolled in Campbell Junior College, now Campbell University, in Buies Creek, North Carolina, seven miles from home. An organic chemistry professor saw promise—a diamond in the rough—in the young John Tew and hired him to sweep floors and assist in his laboratory.

Tew transferred to Wake Forest University for his final two years of undergraduate studies, graduating in 1957. He then entered the Wake Forest University School of Medicine, where he was named "best anatomist" in his freshman class. It was the first academic prize of his life and an acknowledgement of his dexterity with tissue and his ability to confront the insides of the human body. He was inaugurated into Alpha Omega Alpha honor medical society during his junior year of medical school.

Following graduation from medical school in 1961, Tew completed an internship at Cornell Medical Center at New York University (1961-1962); performed a general surgery residency at Peter Bent Brigham Hospital in Boston, Massachusetts (1962-1963); and served as a clinical associate at the National Institutes of Health, National Institute of Neurological Diseases and Blindness, in Bethesda, Maryland (1963-1965).

He performed his neurosurgical residency at the Harvard-Massachusetts General Hospital and Boston Children's Hospital (1965-1969). In a life-changing development, he won the prestigious Van Wagenen Fellowship, which allowed him to train under Dr. Gazi Yasargil, the founder of micro-neurosurgery, at the University of Zurich. There Dr. Tew learned to use the new operating microscope, which was making the treatment of deadly brain aneurysms predictably successful for the first time.

== Career ==
Tew came to Cincinnati in 1970 at the urging of Dr. Frank H. Mayfield, founder of the Mayfield Clinic. That year he also began his academic career as a neurosurgery instructor at the University of Cincinnati College of Medicine. From 1984 to 2014 he trained 62 neurosurgery residents.

From 1982 until 2002 he was chairman and professor of the Department of Neurosurgery at the University of Cincinnati College of Medicine. In 1998 he co-founded the Neuroscience Institute (now the UC Gardner Neuroscience Institute). He was the Institute's medical director (1998-2006) and clinical director (2006-2013).

Tew was the Frank H. Mayfield Professor of Neurosurgery from 1993 to 2002. In 2013 the UC Department of Neurosurgery announced the funding of the John M. Tew, Jr., MD, Chair in Neurosurgical Oncology.

He was the president of the Ohio State Neurosurgical Society (1979), Congress of Neurological Surgeons (1983), the Academy of Neurological surgeons (1995-1996), and the American Academy of Neurological Surgery (1996). He served in the United States Army Reserve (1984-1997) as a Consultant to the Surgeon General. In 1976, Tew and Dr. Thoralf Sundt founded the American Association of Neurological Surgeons/Congress of Neurological Surgeons Section on Cerebrovascular Surgery. His dozens of published journal articles explored research in the treatment of brain tumors, cerebral aneurysms, image-guided surgery and trigeminal neuralgia.

In 1986 Tew became the first U.S. surgeon to test laser surgery, developed in Europe for the treatment of some brain tumors, for the U.S. Food and Drug Administration. He and Eric R. Cosman, PhD, designed the TEW curved electrode for percutaneous stereotactic rhizotomy, a minimally invasive treatment for severe facial pain.

After his retirement from the surgical theater in 2014, Dr. Tew directed the community outreach and philanthropic efforts of UC's Osher Center for Integrative Health while continuing to serve as a tenured professor of neurosurgery at the College of Medicine.

In presenting Tew with the Daniel Drake Humanitarian Award in June 2023, Dr. Joseph Cheng, Frank H. Mayfield Chair of the UC Department of Neurosurgery, described Tew as "one of the original disrupters" who revolutionized microsurgery. "He is a builder of bridges, connecting people across multiple disciplines and time zones to help uncomplicate a seemingly complicated world."

=== Co-authorships ===
- Neurosurgery: State of the Art Reviews, Laser Applications in Neurosurgery, Volume 2, Number 2 ( Hanley & Belfus: Philadelphia, 1987)
- Lasers in Neurosurgery (Springer-Verlag: Wien and New York, 1988)
- Atlas of Operative Microneurosurgery, Volume I (WB Saunders: Philadelphia, 1994).
- Atlas of Operative Microneurosurgery, Volume II (WB Saunders: Philadelphia, 2001)

=== Awards ===
- William P. Van Wagenen Fellowship, awarded by American Association of Neurological Surgeons (1970)
- Pro ecclesia et pontifice medal, Papal honor presented by Archbishop Daniel E. Pilarczyk (1989)
- Distinguished Service Citation, National Conference of Christians and Jews (1995)
- Daniel Drake Medal, University of Cincinnati (2002)
- Honorary Fellow, Royal College of Surgeons of Edinburgh, Scotland (2003)
- Health Care Heroes Lifetime Achievement Award, Cincinnati Business Courier (2007)
- Boy Scouts of America Eagle Court of Honor (2007)
- Great Living Cincinnatian, Cincinnati USA Regional Chamber (2010)
- Daniel Drake Humanitarian Award, Academy of Medicine of Cincinnati (2023)

=== Personal life ===
Tew married Susan Smyth in 1966.
