= Hancock Aortic Tissue Valve =

Prosthetic heart valve

- Type: Medical Devices
- Inventor: Warren Hancock, Thomas J. Fogarty
- Inception: 1960
- Manufacturer: Hancock Jaffe Laboratories, Johnson & Johnson
- Available: No
- Current supplier: Medtronic
- Last production year: 1999
- Models: T505, T510
- Website: https://www.medtronic.com/us-en/healthcare-professionals/products/cardiovascular/heart-valves-surgical/hancock-ii-hancock-ii-ultra-bioprostheses.html

The Hancock Aortic Tissue Valve is a prosthetic heart valve used in cardiac surgery to replace a damaged or diseased aortic valve. It is a bioprosthetic valve, meaning it is constructed using biological tissues, specifically porcine (pig) valve tissue. This valve is widely utilized in the field of cardiovascular surgery to restore proper blood flow through the heart.

== Development and History ==
The Hancock Aortic Tissue Valve was invented by Warren Hancock. In the late 1960s and early 1970s, Warren Hancock, an American engineer, collaborated with the medical community to develop a cutting-edge bioprosthetic heart valve. The valve was first introduced by the American company Medtronic. The design of the Hancock valve is based on the concept of xenografts, utilizing pig tissue due to its structural similarities to human heart valves.

== Composition ==
The Hancock Aortic Tissue Valve is composed of porcine valve tissue mounted within a supporting stent frame. The valve is sewn into a fabric-covered sewing ring, facilitating secure attachment within the patient's aortic annulus during the implantation procedure. The design aims to closely mimic the natural function of the human aortic valve, allowing for efficient blood flow and minimizing the risk of complications.

== Applications ==
The Hancock Aortic Tissue Valve is commonly used in patients requiring aortic valve replacement due to conditions such as aortic stenosis or aortic regurgitation. The choice between a mechanical or bioprosthetic valve depends on various factors, including the patient's age, lifestyle, and medical history.

== Advantages ==
1. Biocompatibility: The use of porcine tissue enhances the biocompatibility of the valve, reducing the risk of adverse reactions and promoting tissue integration.
2. Durability: The Hancock valve is designed to withstand the rigors of the cardiovascular system, providing long-term durability and reliability.
3. Hemodynamic Performance: The valve's design allows for optimal blood flow, minimizing turbulence and pressure gradients, which is essential for maintaining cardiac function.
4. Reduced Anticoagulation Requirement: Unlike mechanical valves, bioprosthetic valves like the Hancock Aortic Tissue Valve may reduce the need for lifelong anticoagulation therapy in some patients.

== Disadvantages ==
Prosthetic heart valves, including the Hancock Aortic Tissue Valve, are not without drawbacks. Structural degradation is a risk, potentially necessitating reoperation. Studies have indicated the need for ongoing research and improvement in bioprosthetic valve technology to address such concerns

== Procedure ==
The implantation of the Hancock Aortic Tissue Valve typically involves open-heart surgery. During the procedure, the damaged or diseased native aortic valve is removed, and the prosthetic valve is sutured in its place. The secure attachment of the valve is crucial to ensure proper functionality and prevent complications such as leakage.
