= TriHealth Bethesda North Hospital =

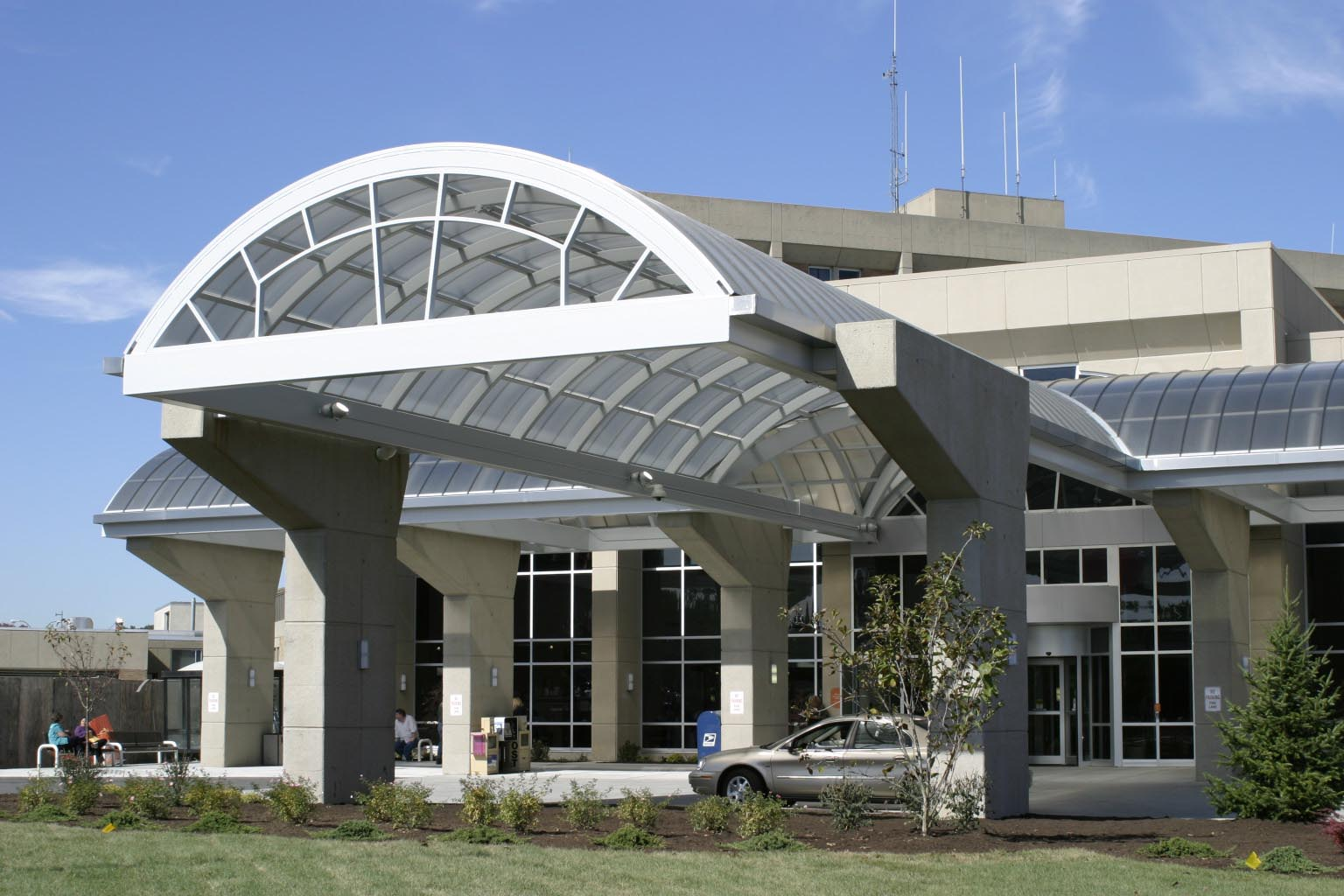
- Main entrance of Bethesda North Hospital

Geography
- Location: Montgomery, Ohio, United States
- Coordinates: 39.2521°N 84.3422°W

Organization
- Type: Teaching
- Network: TriHealth

Services
- Beds: 360

History
- Opened: 1888

Links
- Website: www.trihealth.com/hospitals-and-practices/bethesda-north-hospital
- Lists: Hospitals in Ohio

TriHealth Bethesda North Hospital is an acute, tertiary, teaching hospital in Montgomery, Ohio, United States that provides a wide range of services to individuals and families throughout the northeast corridor of Cincinnati and into Butler, Clinton and Warren counties. Founded in 1970 as a community satellite facility, Bethesda North is now the fourth largest hospital in Greater Cincinnati. The non-profit hospital is member of TriHealth, a community partnership between Bethesda and Good Samaritan Hospital.

== History ==
Bethesda North Hospital was established in 1970 as a satellite of Bethesda Hospital in Cincinnati, which was later known as Bethesda Oak Hospital. Bethesda North grew to 235 beds in 1979 (approximately 360 as of 2017) and opened an outpatient surgery center in 1987. As the community grew, so did its desire for an even larger selection of specialty medical services. Over the years, Bethesda met this need by adding maternity services; providing regionally recognized specialty services, including a breast center, fertility center and endoscopy services; investing in increasingly sophisticated diagnostic imaging and neurological equipment; and offering open-heart surgery. It also is one of only two designated adult Trauma Centers in the area.

In 2003, Bethesda North met demand for higher volume, increased technological sophistication and improved access through a multimillion-dollar expansion. The 62,000-square-foot (5,800 m^{2}) expansion has added four new surgical suites to increase operating room capacity by 30 percent. A new cardiac/vascular procedure lab and cardiopulmonary/nuclear medicine expansion also will enhance the care Bethesda North provides.
