= Fogarty embolectomy catheter =

Device developed to remove fresh emboli in the arterial system

Fogarty arterial embolectomy catheter is a device developed in 1961 by Dr. Thomas J. Fogarty to remove fresh emboli in the arterial system. It consists of a hollow tube with an inflatable balloon attached to its tip. The catheter is inserted into the blood vessel through a clot. The balloon is then inflated to extract the clot from the vessel. It is available in different lengths and sizes, and is often colour coded by size. Because it is less invasive than ordinary surgery, it reduces the chance of postoperative complications.

For removal of adherent material or fibrous material, Fogarty adherent clot catheter may be used.
