= TriHealth =

Healthcare provider in Ohio

TriHealth, Inc.
- Type: Nonprofit
- Industry: Health care
- Founded: 1995; 31 years ago, in Cincinnati, Ohio, United States
- Headquarters: Cincinnati, Ohio, United States
- Area served: Greater Cincinnati, Southwest Ohio, North America
- Key people: Terri Hanlon-Bremer (president and CEO)
- Number of employees: 13,000
- Website: trihealth.com

TriHealth, Inc. is a nonprofit integrated health system based in Cincinnati, Ohio, United States. Formed in 1995, the system operates five general acute-care hospitals: Bethesda North, Good Samaritan, Bethesda Butler, McCullough-Hyde Memorial Hospital, and TriHealth Clinton Regional Hospital (formerly Clinton Memorial Hospital).

In addition to its inpatient hospitals, TriHealth operates two regional freestanding emergency departments—Bethesda Arrow Springs in Lebanon and Good Samaritan Western Ridge in Green Township—along with ambulatory outpatient centers and primary care practices throughout Southwest Ohio. The organization is one of the largest employers in greater Cincinnati, with approximately 13,000 workers.

== History ==
In 1995, the sponsors of Bethesda Hospital and Good Samaritan Hospital formed an operating partnership to establish TriHealth.

In November 2012, TriHealth acquired the Butler County Medical Center in Hamilton, Ohio, reopening it as Bethesda Butler Hospital. That same month, the organization terminated approximately 150 employees who did not comply with a mandatory influenza vaccination policy.

In 2015, TriHealth finalized an affiliation agreement with McCullough-Hyde Memorial Hospital in Oxford, Ohio, making it an operating entity within the health system while retaining a local community board of directors.

In December 2015, John Prout retired as president and chief executive officer of TriHealth and was succeeded by Mark Clement in 2016. Terri Hanlon-Bremer succeeded Clement as president and CEO in 2026.

In January 2020, TriHealth initiated an $85 million expansion and modernization project at Bethesda North Hospital in Montgomery, Ohio.

In April 2021, the system disclosed a data security incident after patient and employee information was compromised through a third-party law firm used by the network.

In February 2023, TriHealth announced a multi-year, $250 million master facility plan to modernize and expand Good Samaritan Hospital, including the construction of a new five-story, 168,000-square-foot clinical services building.

In June 2025, TriHealth entered into an agreement to acquire Clinton Memorial Hospital (CMH) and its related assets in Wilmington, Ohio, transitioning the facility into the system under the name TriHealth Clinton Regional Hospital.

== Facilities ==
TriHealth operates five acute-care inpatient hospitals:

- Bethesda North Hospital (Montgomery, Ohio) – Tertiary medical center and acute care facility.
- Good Samaritan Hospital (Cincinnati, Clifton) – Tertiary teaching hospital founded by the Sisters of Charity.
- Bethesda Butler Hospital (Hamilton, Ohio) – Community hospital acquired in 2012.
- McCullough-Hyde Memorial Hospital (Oxford, Ohio) – Critical access community hospital affiliated since 2015.
- TriHealth Clinton Regional Hospital (Wilmington, Ohio) – Regional community hospital acquired in 2025.

The system also operates two freestanding emergency and ambulatory centers:

- Bethesda Arrow Springs (Lebanon, Ohio)
- Good Samaritan Western Ridge (Green Township)
