= AdvaMed =

American trade association for medical devices

- Industry: Medical Technology
- Headquarters: Washington, D.C.
- Key people: Scott Whitaker (CEO); Peter Arduini (Board Chairman)
- Website: www.advamed.org

AdvaMed, or the Advanced Medical Technology Association, is an American medical device trade association, based in Washington, D.C. It is the largest medical device association in the world with U.S. and international members who are medical technology companies (medical devices, diagnostic products, and health information systems) that collectively represents 80% of U.S. medical technology firms in the United States, that produce close to 90% of annual health care technology purchases in the United States and more than 40% globally.

Scott Whitaker is AdvaMed’s president and CEO, its chairman Peter Arduini, is also CEO of GE HealthCare.

== Policies ==
AdvaMed’s website states that the organization promotes competitive policies that foster the highest ethical standards, rapid product approvals, appropriate reimbursement, and access to international markets.

The Innovation Agenda identifies five core policy pillars: improving the FDA’s regulatory processes, restructuring CMS’s coverage and payment processes, reforming the U.S. tax system to create a level playing field, improving access to international markets, and supporting the maintenance and growth of an R&D infrastructure.

=== Medical Device Tax ===
AdvaMed has consistently and strongly opposed the 2.3% medical device excise tax imposed by the Affordable Care Act in 2013, stating that it harms job creation, deters medical innovation needed to save and improve patients’ lives, and inhibits economic growth.

In 2015, Congress temporarily suspended the medical device excise tax. While AdvaMed supported the suspension, the association continues to push for full and permanent repeal of the tax. Whitaker has stated that “It’s not enough to delay or further suspend this disruptive tax, even if for a longer period of time. It simply does not give industry the certainty and confidence it needs to make these critical long-term R&D investments. The time is now. We stand ready to help this administration, Congress, and the nation get Americans back on the job."

In February 2017, AdvaMed released data from the U.S. Department of Commerce revealing that the U.S. medical technology industry saw its jobs ranks fall by nearly 29,000 while the medical device excise tax was in effect.

=== AdvaMed and FDA's Finalized Human Factors Guidance for Combination Products ===
In 2016, the FDA released the first draft of its guidance on applying human factors engineering principles to combination products. It immediately faced criticism from AdvaMed, citing overly burdensome requirements. Seven years later, in 2023, the FDA finalized its guidance and released the final draft. It is intended to complement the FDA's 2011 device guidance and a separate document on "Safety Considerations for Product Design to Minimize Medication Errors." The finalized guidance addresses specific questions that may arise during the development of combination products, focusing on user interactions and clinical trials support.

=== Opposition to right-to-repair legislation ===
In July 2024, AdvaMed signed a letter to members of both the House Committee on Armed Services and the Senate Committee on Armed Services opposing Section 828 of S. 4628, the National Defense Authorization Act for Fiscal Year 2025, entitled "Requirement for Contractors to Provide Reasonable Access to Repair Materials," which would require contractors doing business with the US military to agree "to provide the Department of Defense fair and reasonable access to all the repair materials, including parts, tools, and information, used by the manufacturer or provider or their authorized partners to diagnose, maintain, or repair the good or service."

== VentConnect platform ==
In August 2020, The Advanced Medical Technology Association (AdvaMed) reported that VentConnect is growing its network. The updated MedDeviceNetwork network (MedDeviceNetwork.org) would expand past ventilators and incorporate many emerging medical devices in the current battle against COVID-19 and other potential health crises that America's doctors and caregivers require.
