= University of Cincinnati Medical Center =

- University of Cincinnati Health
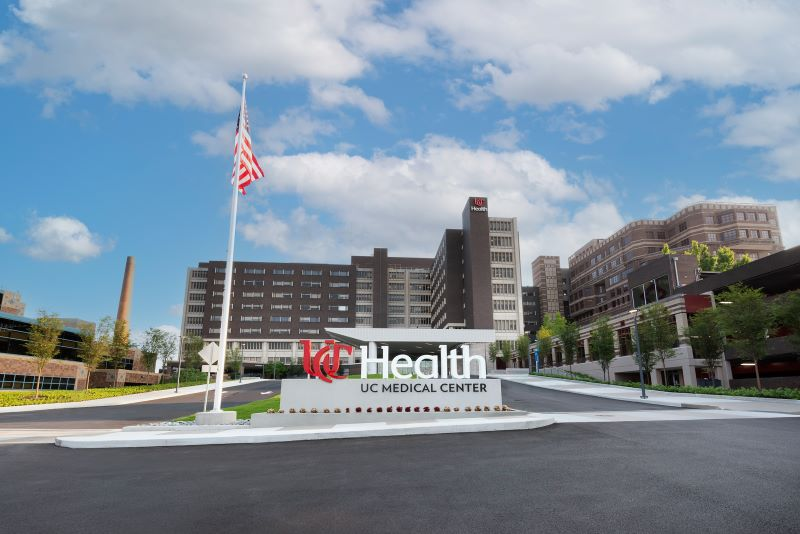
- University of Cincinnati Medical Center

Geography
- Location: Cincinnati, Ohio, United States
- Coordinates: 39.137°N 84.504°W

Organization
- Type: University
- Affiliated university: UC College of Medicine

Services
- Emergency department: Level I trauma center
- Beds: 724

Helipads
- Helipad: FAA LID: 8OH9

History
- Founded: 1821

Links
- Lists: Hospitals in Ohio

The University of Cincinnati Medical Center (UCMC) is a primary teaching hospital for the University of Cincinnati College of Medicine. Located in the Corryville neighborhood of Cincinnati, UCMC is the flagship institution of the UC Health system and is part of the Clifton campus of that system. UCMC has the only level 1 emergency trauma center in the Cincinnati metropolitan area. The hospital has 724 licensed beds.

At various times since its founding in 1821 it has been known by names including Cincinnati Hospital, Commercial Hospital, General Hospital, and University Hospital.

== History ==
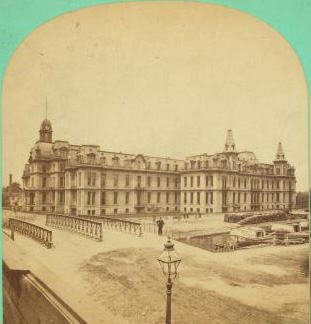
The Commercial Hospital, on the banks of the Miami & Erie Canal in the late 19th century.

The Ohio General Assembly chartered the Commercial Hospital and Lunatic Asylum of Ohio, predecessor of today's University of Cincinnati Medical Center, in 1821. It was completed and occupied in 1823. The charter required the hospital to provide indigent care in exchange for using the cases for medical training for the Medical College of Ohio (today's University of Cincinnati College of Medicine).

The plans for the initial hospital building were drawn up by the physician Daniel Drake, who also founded the Medical College of Ohio. Like a number of smaller urban hospitals in the early 19th century, it was built as a single rectangular building with a central halway. It was situated adjacent to the Miami and Erie Canal at the 12th Street Bridge.

The hospital ceased to be a state institution in 1838 with the establishment of the Columbus State Hospital. It was purchased by the city of Cincinnati in 1861, and razed and rebuilt on the same site in the late 1860s. An ambulance service was established in 1865 and by 1872 the ambulances could be summoned throughout the city by telegraph.

Although the hospital was municipally owned in the late 19th century, it offered a multi-tiered approach to care, with paying customers divided into large wards for the poor, smaller wards for the wealthier, and private rooms for the upper class. By 1873 the hospital offered 30 private rooms.

In 1915 the hospital was rebuilt as Cincinnati General Hospital and moved to a more spacious campus on a hilltop in Corryville, away from the canal and closer to the University of Cincinnati. The new structure was patterned after European examples such as the Virchow hospital in Berlin, and became influential on the design of other hospitals in the United States. It was divided into numerous pavilions that each held a separate clinical specialty.

In 1962 ownership of the hospital was transferred from the city of Cincinnati to the University of Cincinnati, and took the name University Hospital. In 1969 the modern high-rise structure of the hospital replaced the low-rise pavilions of the General Hospital.

In 1994, the hospital joined several other healthcare providers in the Cincinnati area as part of the Health Alliance of Greater Cincinnati. This alliance broke up in 2010 and was replaced by UC Health.

== Works cited ==
- Bell, Ryan Corbett (2009). The Ambulance: A History. McFarland. ISBN 9780786438112.
- Kisacky, Jeanne (2017). Rise of the Modern Hospital: An Architectural History of Health and Healing, 1870-1940. University of Pittsburgh Press. ISBN 9780822981619.
