= The Jewish Hospital – Mercy Health =

The Jewish Hospital
- Mercy Health
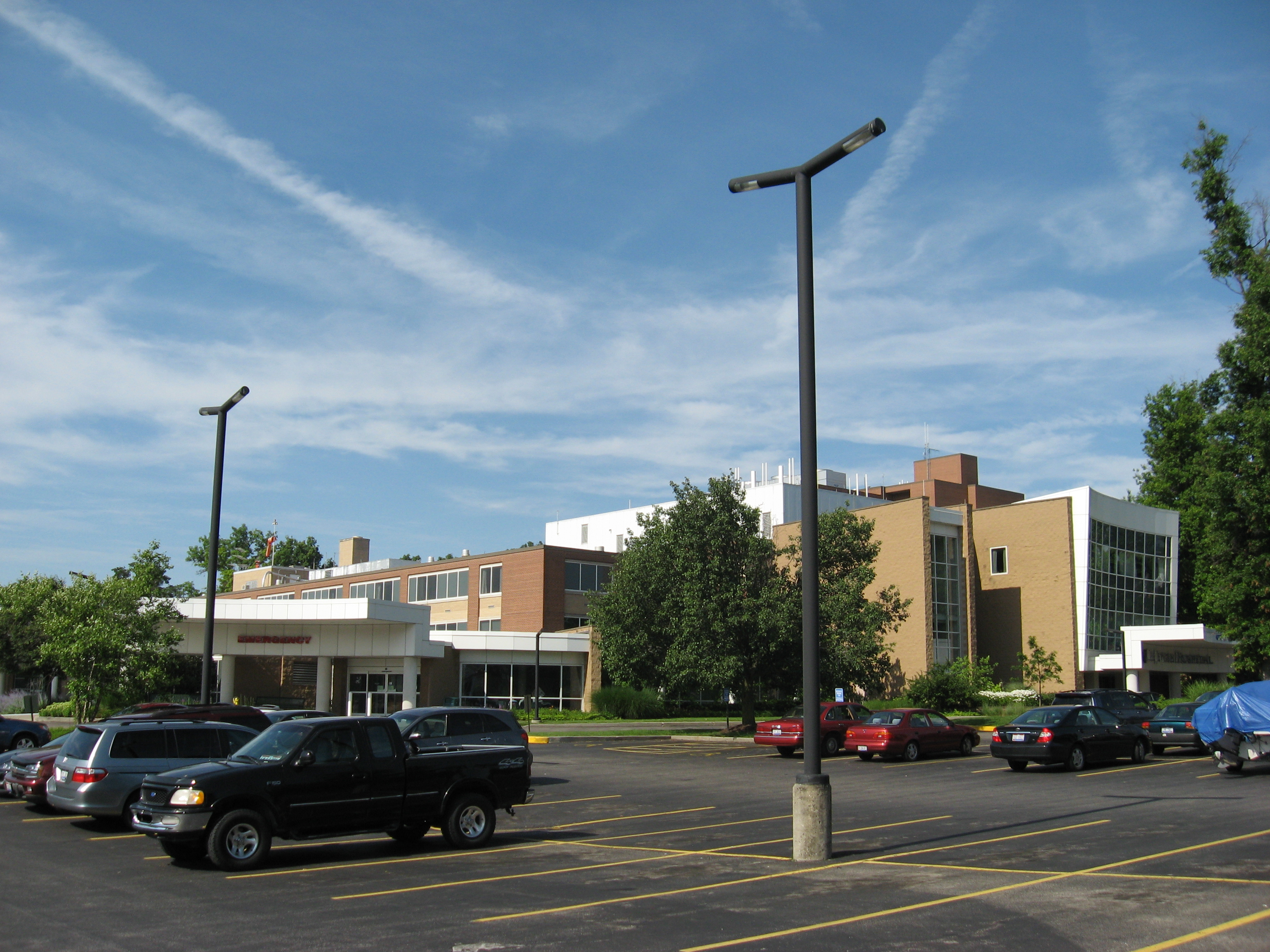

Geography
- Location: Cincinnati, Cincinnati, Ohio, United States
- Coordinates: 39.2059467624813°N 84.38102442017397°W

Organization
- Religious affiliation: Catholic, Jewish

Services
- Emergency department: Yes, Level I Trauma Center
- Beds: 184

Helipads
- Helipad: Yes, 8OA3

History
- Opened: 1847; 179 years ago

Links
- Lists: Hospitals in Ohio

The Jewish Hospital – Mercy Health in Cincinnati, Ohio, is the first Jewish hospital established in the United States. It is owned and operated by the non-profit Mercy Health.

== History ==
Originally named The Jewish Hospital, the organization was established in either 1847 or 1850 in response to a cholera epidemic for treating the affected Jewish population of Cincinnati. It was also a reaction to the fact that at other hospitals Jewish patients were subject to pressure from Christian missionaries seeking deathbed conversions, and also to provide for kosher dietary concerns of observant Jews.

On March 30, 1890, the Jewish Hospital dedicated a new location on Burnet Avenue, near the Jewish community in Mount Auburn and Avondale. It was the first anchor of what would become known as Pill Hill as more hospitals were built nearby. Eventually, the Jewish community moved out of Mount Auburn and Avondale, leading to Jewish Hospital's move to Kenwood in 1997.

The Jewish Hospital has earned accolades and distinction from various health ranking services, and is a former member of the Health Alliance of Greater Cincinnati, likewise a nationally recognized organization.

In 2009, Mercy Health, also in Cincinnati, purchased the hospital for approximately $108 million. Under an agreement with the Jewish Federation of Cincinnati, Mercy Health will maintain the name and symbols of The Jewish Hospital, continue to respect Jewish holidays and traditions, and invest in the hospital's facilities and technology.

== Facilities ==
The Jewish Hospital – Mercy Health is a 184-bed short-term acute care hospital. It has a fully functional emergency department; however, level 1 Trauma patients are routed to The University of Cincinnati. The hospital provides training and education for 69 residents and interns. It was named one of the US’s top 50 hospitals in 2026.

== See also ==
- Mount Sinai Hospital (Manhattan)
