= Cincinnati Children's Hospital Medical Center =

Coordinates: 39.141°N 84.502°W

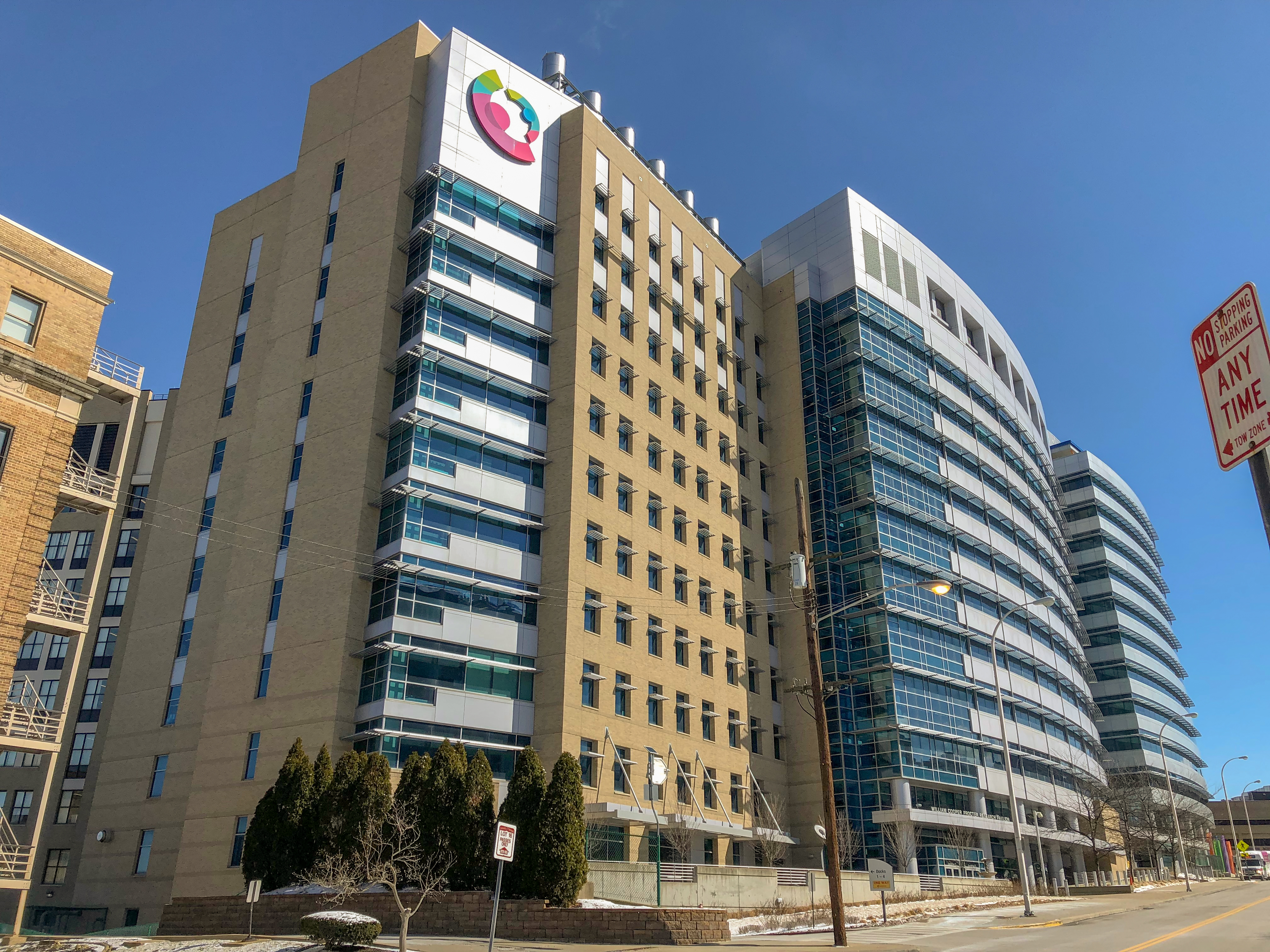
- The William Cooper Procter Pavilion at Cincinnati Children's Hospital Medical Center

Geography
- Location: 3333 Burnet Avenue, Cincinnati, Ohio, United States

Organization
- Type: Research, Community, Teaching
- Affiliated university: University of Cincinnati

Services
- Emergency department: Level 1 Pediatric Trauma Center
- Beds: 634 registered inpatient beds

History
- Founded: 1883

Links
- Website: www.cincinnatichildrens.org
- Lists: Hospitals in Ohio

Cincinnati Children's Hospital Medical Center (CCHMC) is an academic pediatric acute care children's hospital located in the Avondale neighborhood of Cincinnati, Ohio. The hospital has more than 670 registered beds and is affiliated with the University of Cincinnati Health. The hospital provides comprehensive pediatric specialties and subspecialties to pediatric patients aged 0–21 throughout southern Ohio and northern Kentucky, as well as patients from around the United States and the world. Cincinnati Children's Hospital Medical Center also treats adults, including adults with congenital heart disease and young adults with blood disease or cancer. Cincinnati Children's Hospital Medical Center also features a Level 1 Pediatric Trauma Center, 1 of 4 in the state. Cincinnati Children's is home to a large neonatology department that oversees newborn nurseries at local hospitals around Ohio. The hospital features an AAP verified 89-bed Level IV (highest possible) Newborn Intensive Care Unit.

Cincinnati Children's ranked first among all Honor Roll hospitals in the 2024-25 U.S. News & World Report survey of best children's hospitals in the United States. The hospital receives the second-most NIH funds of any pediatric institution in the United States and the pediatric residency training program at Cincinnati Children's is among the largest in the country, training approximately 200 graduate physicians each year.

== History ==
In June 1883, a meeting of women from Episcopal congregations around Cincinnati established a mission to create a Diocesan Hospital for Children. On November 16, 1883, the "Hospital of the Protestant Episcopal Church" of the Episcopal Diocese of Southern Ohio was incorporated.

The original articles of incorporation included the following statement: "This corporation is not created for profit, but will rely for its establishment and support on the voluntary gifts and contribution of the charitable and humane, and therefore is to have no capital stock."

While these articles of incorporation describe, "The purpose for which the corporation is formed is: 1. To provide medical and surgical aid and nursing for sick, infirm, and disabled children, either in the wards of the Hospital or at their homes."

The hospital's focus on pediatric care was not the long-term intention, but rather was due to limited available funding. The second purpose listed in the articles of incorporation was, "2. To provide (in a department distinct from that devoted to children), so soon as the funds of the corporation shall warrant, medical and surgical aid and nursing for sick and disabled adults, either in the wards of the Hospital or in their homes."

The hospital opened in March 1884 in a rented home in Walnut Hills, a community north of downtown Cincinnati, at the corners of Park Avenue and Kemper Street (now Yale). This building provided for fifteen patients, and within eight months had admitted a total of 38 children. The only patients eligible for admission were aged 1–15, suffering from an acute or chronic disease (or convalescent from such), required medical or surgical treatment. The hospital provided free care, without regard to race, religion, creed or color. The only restriction was that no child with an infectious disease may be admitted.

The small house was inadequate, with only three bedrooms, one small bathroom, and not enough hot water or heat. Generous contributors J. Josiah and Thomas J. Emery came to the rescue. They donated land in Mt. Auburn and built a three-story brick hospital. On November 23, 1887, all patients were transferred from the Walnut Hills location to the new hospital on Mason Street, near The Christ Hospital.

Originally endowed with a fund of $3,506.48 in November 1884, the hospital's endowment had grown to over $85,000 by the turn of the 20th century.

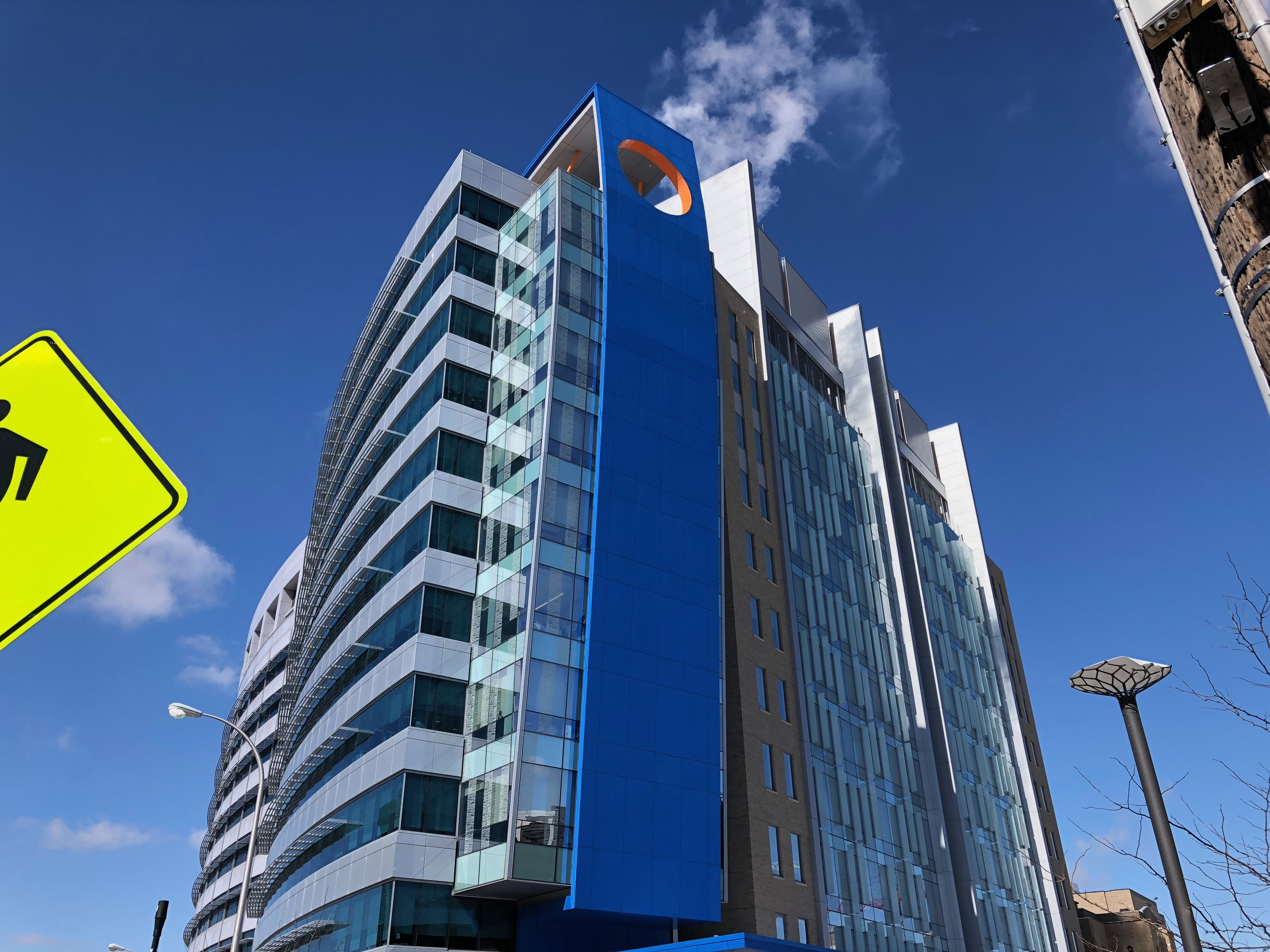
Clinical Sciences Pavilion

In 1904, a new three-story wing, connecting with the rear of the main building, was built. The addition cost over $20,000 at the time, and included provisions for a large play-room, a chapel and an isolation ward for children with contagious diseases. A new operating room was installed on the top floor of the main hospital at this time, and various other improvements increased the capacity of the hospital at this time to 90 beds.

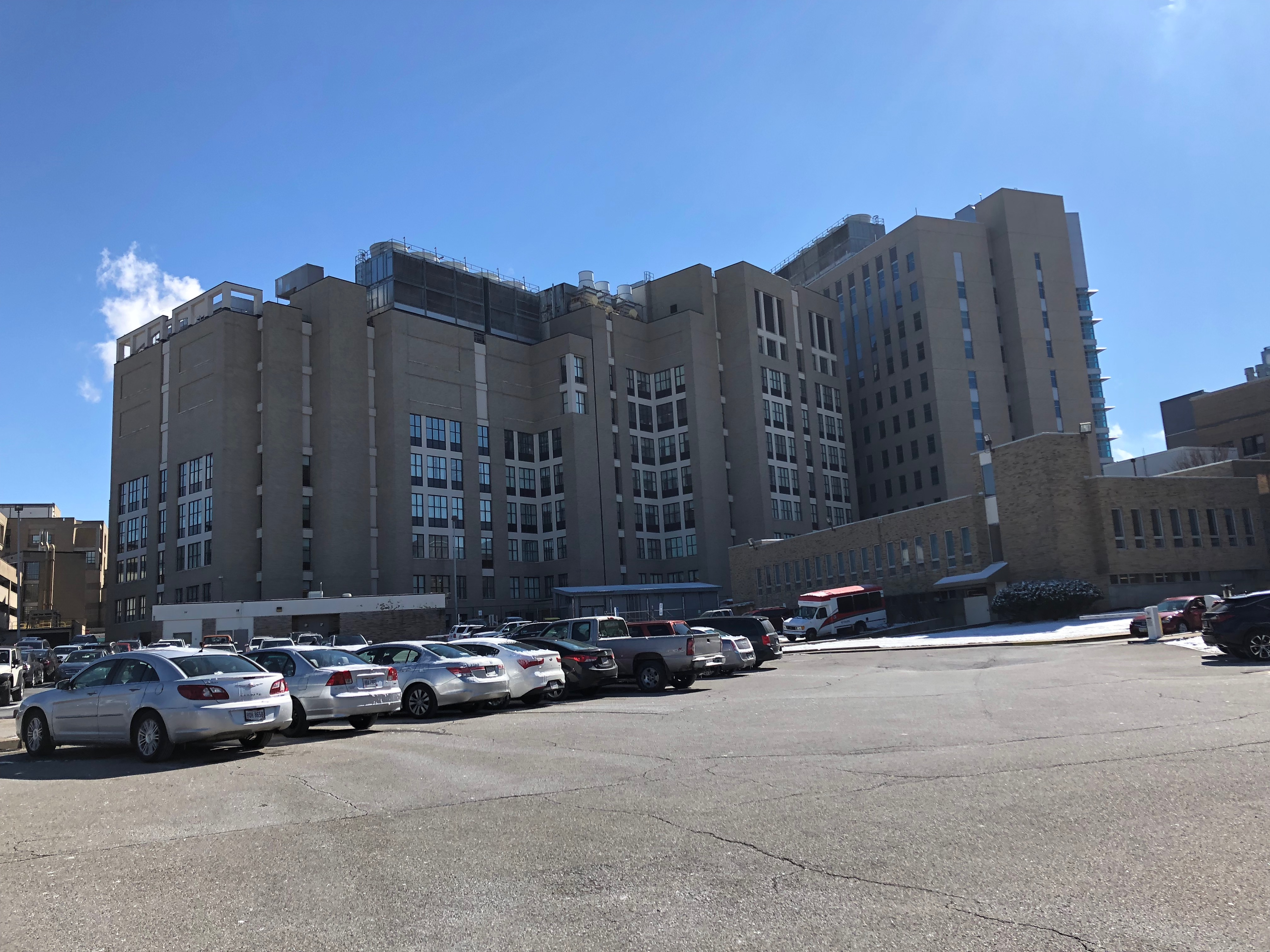
Cincinnati Children's Hospital, Corryville

The 1920s brought dramatic changes while under the leadership of William Cooper Procter, president of the board of trustees, and Albert Graeme Mitchell, MD, chair of the Department of Pediatrics at the University of Cincinnati College of Medicine and physician-in-chief of The Children's Hospital. In 1926, the hospital moved to a new 200-bed facility near the College of Medicine and established an academic affiliation with the college. In 1928, William Cooper Procter donated $2.5 million to build and endow The Children's Hospital Research Foundation, which opened in 1931. The hospital entered the decade of the 1930s as an important center for pediatric patient care, education and research—as it continues to be today.

The hospital has been involved in a variety of medical breakthroughs, most prominently Dr. Albert Sabin's development of the oral polio vaccine, which went into use in the United States in 1960.

== Facts and figures ==
The hospital served patients from 51 countries and 50 states in fiscal 2018. It recorded 1,281,902 patient encounters, 951,434 outpatient specialty visits, 173,023 Emergency and Urgent Care visits, 83,162 outpatient primary care visits, 34,295 surgical procedures and 46,214 surgical hours. In fiscal 2018, Cincinnati Children's trained 272 clinical fellows, 181 research postdoctoral fellows, and 200 residents. Revenues in fiscal 2018 totaled $2.408 billion, including more than $181 million in research grants. Cincinnati Children's Hospital Medical Center employed 15,755 people in fiscal 2018. The active medical staff totaled 1,503, including hospital-based faculty and community-based physicians.

For research, Cincinnati Children's receives the third highest awards to a pediatric institution from the National Institutes of Health and is recognized as one of the top five pediatric training institutions in the United States.

== Awards and rankings ==
- 1st in U.S. News Best Children's Hospitals 2024/25 Honor Roll
  - Specialty rankings, 2024/25
    - 1st in Pediatric Cancer
    - 1st in Pediatric Gastroenterology & GI Surgery
    - 1st in Pediatric Pulmonology & Lung Surgery
    - 2nd in Pediatric Diabetes & Endocrinology
    - 3rd in Pediatric Nephrology
    - 3rd in Pediatric Neurology & Neurosurgery
    - 3rd in Pediatric Orthopedics
    - 5th in Pediatric Cardiology & Heart Surgery
    - 6th in Neonatology
    - 9th in Pediatric Urology
    - Top 50 in Pediatric & Adolescent Behavioral Health
- 3rd highest recipient of grants from the National Institutes of Health (NIH) for pediatric research
- Magnet status, awarded by the American Nurses Credentialing Center
- Named to the Leapfrog Group's list of the top 10 children's hospitals for quality and safety
- American Hospital Association-McKesson Quest for Quality Prize for its leadership in improving outcomes through family-centered care and a dedication to transparency (2006)

== See also ==
- List of children's hospitals in the United States
- Albert B. Chandler Hospital
- Nationwide Children's Hospital
- Akron Children's Hospital
