= TriHealth Good Samaritan Hospital =

Coordinates: 39°08′24″N 84°31′18″W

- The Dixmyth Patient Care Tower expansion, which opened in Spring 2007

Geography
- Location: Cincinnati, Ohio, United States

Organization
- Care system: Private
- Type: Community
- Affiliated university: Good Samaritan College of Nursing and Health Science

Services
- Beds: 700

Helipads
- Helipad: FAA LID: 92OI

History
- Founded: 1852

Links
- Website: www.trihealth.com/locations/good-samaritan-hospital
- Lists: Hospitals in Ohio

TriHealth Good Samaritan Hospital is the oldest and largest private teaching and specialty health care facility in Cincinnati, Ohio. It opened in 1852 under the sponsorship of the Sisters of Charity. The hospital is member of TriHealth, a joint operating agreement between Catholic Health Initiatives and Bethesda, Inc. Cincinnati to manage Good Samaritan.

== History ==
=== Origins ===
In 1852, recognizing the need for a hospital that would provide care to people who could not afford the medical treatment they needed, Archbishop John Purcell of the Roman Catholic Archdiocese of Cincinnati purchased a 21-bed former eye hospital and turned it over to the Sisters of Charity of Cincinnati. It was named St. John's Hotel for Invalids, and was the first private hospital in the city.

The original eye hospital was perhaps formed by Dr. Daniel Drake, who received a charter from the Ohio General Assembly for a medical school in 1819 and, in 1821, a charter for the city infirmary called the Commercial Hospital and Lunatic Asylum of the State of Ohio. "Commercial" referred to commerce, and this is where the sick and injured river and canal men were brought.

Three years after St. John's opened, demand compelled the sisters to expand. Four members of the medical staff of St. John's Hospital, as it had become known, paid the costs of relocating and renovating an old colonial mansion at the corner of Third and Plum Streets to accommodate 70 beds.

=== At the former military hospital ===
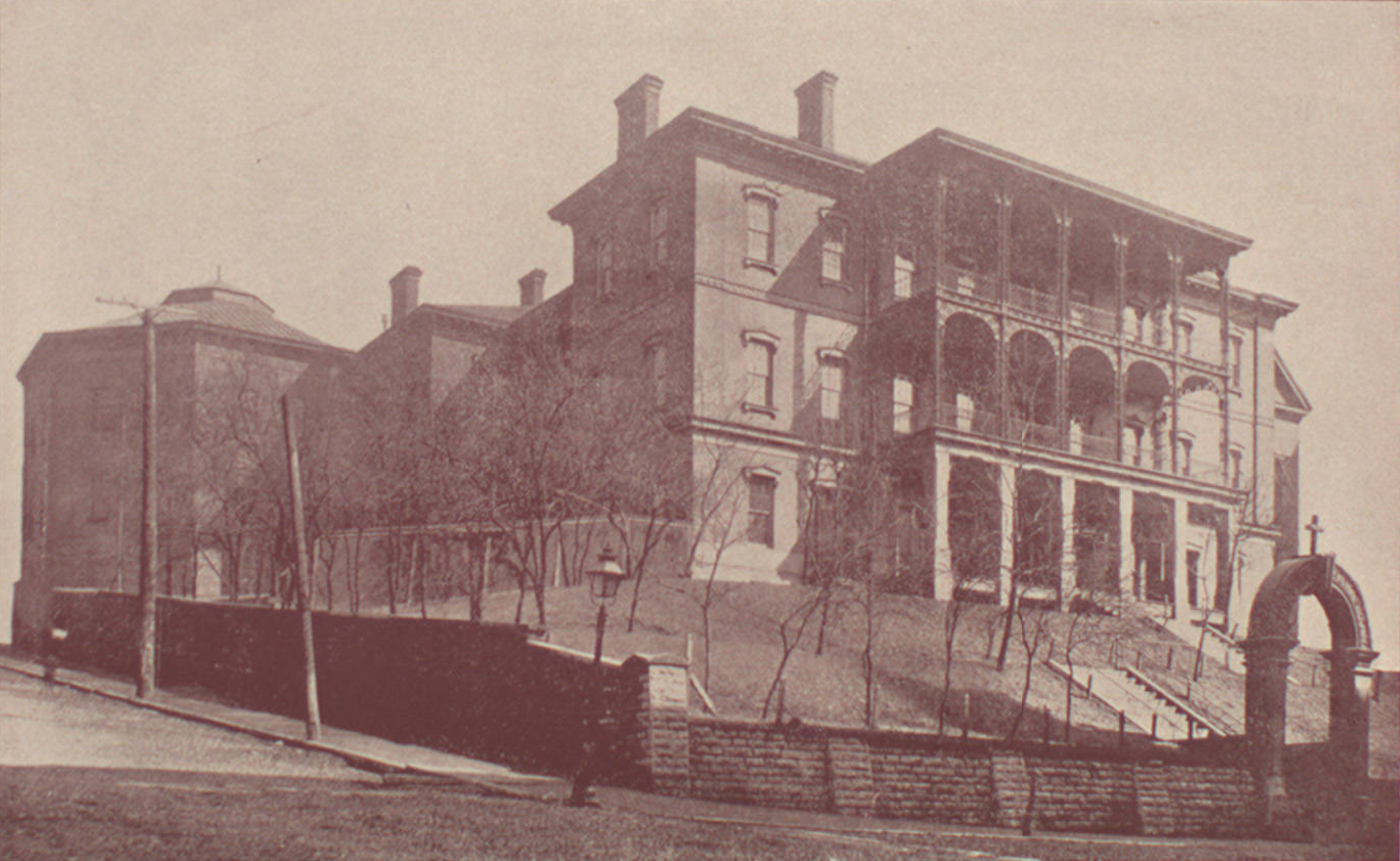
The former Cincinnati Marine Hospital in use as Good Samaritan Hospital around 1896

The kindness of the sisters of St. John's led directly to the expansion, relocation and renaming of the hospital as Good Samaritan Hospital. A destitute man suffering from typhoid fever passed a long recovery at St. John's and when he recovered, the sisters gave him a job. A local banker, Joseph C. Butler, had referred the man to the hospital, and when he attempted to pay the man's bills, the sisters dismissed the charges, explaining that their care was “for the love of God.” Impressed, Butler and his friend Louis Worthington purchased a large hospital that was being sold by the U.S. government at the close of the Civil War. The deed was presented to the sisters with two conditions: that no one be excluded from the hospital because of his color or religion, and that the hospital be renamed “the Hospital of the Good Samaritan,” in honor of the sisters' kindness. The new 95-bed Good Samaritan Hospital opened at Sixth and Lock streets, near downtown Cincinnati, in October 1866.

During the Civil War, the hospital building had been the military hospital of Cincinnati, which was operated first as a volunteer hospital, supported by community donations, until it was obvious that the war would last more than 90 days, thus it was taken over by the Army Medical Department. It was built at a cost of $300,000, from a generic pattern by American architect, Robert Mills. Because there was already a place for merchant seamen (rivermen) to go, there were insufficient numbers of such men to warrant opening the hospital. After the war, Butler and Worthington purchased the hospital from the government for about $70,000 and donated it to the Sisters of Charity.

Medical education at Good Samaritan Hospital began later in 1866. The facilities at Good Samaritan Hospital first provided training grounds for the Medical College of Ohio and Miami Medical College and the work of several early physicians brought the hospital national acclaim. The surgical amphitheater, built largely as a result of contributions solicited by staff member and surgeon Robert Bartholow MD, was the scene of early investigative work in general surgery, brain surgery and obstetrics. By 1875, 800 medical students were being trained in Cincinnati, many of them at Good Samaritan Hospital and by 1899, the first class of eight nurses had graduated from the Good Samaritan Hospital School of Nursing.

In 1907, a five-bed annex to the Sixth and Lock streets location was established in the old Resor mansion at the corner of Clifton and Resor Avenues in the Cincinnati neighborhood of Clifton.

=== Current campus ===
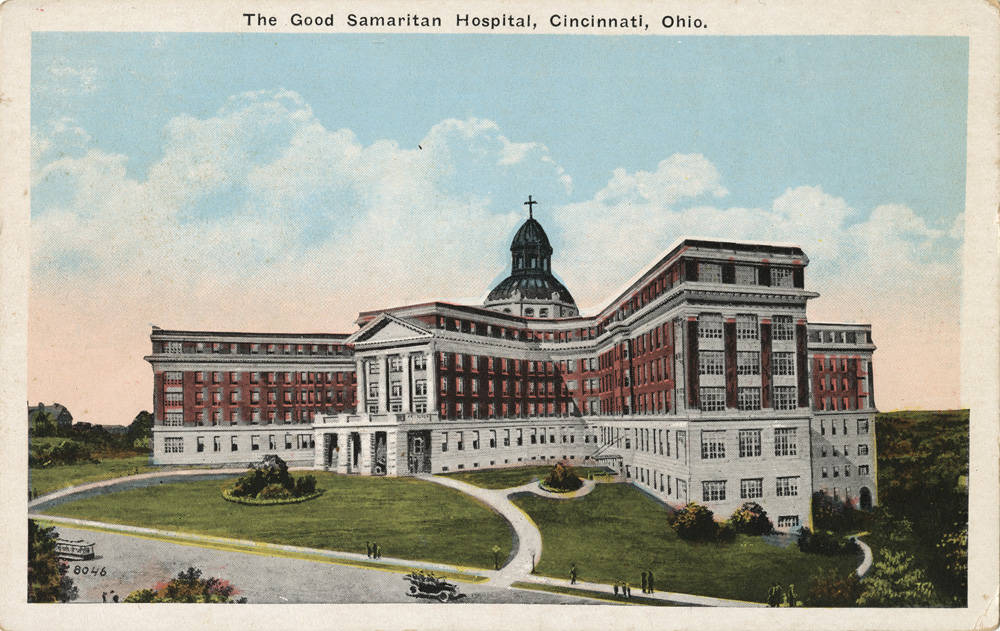
The original building on the current campus, soon after its completion

When the decision was made to relocate the entire Good Samaritan Hospital to Clifton, the property was deemed “too hilly.” Instead, Sister Victoria Fulweiler, the hospital's administrator, secured acres at Good Samaritan's current University Heights site near Pill Hill. Longtime benefactor Joseph C. Butler Jr. was contacted and again gave generously, providing the sisters with 6 acres (24,000 m^{2}) adjoining the property they had purchased. Local architect Gustave W. Drach was hired to design the new building.

Since opening in its current location as a two-wing facility in 1915, the hospital has grown to one of the largest hospitals in the city, encompassing more than a city block. A third wing opened in 1927 and increased the hospital's capacity to 639 beds. A fourth wing was opened in 1959. The current Dixmyth patient care tower building opened in 1985. One of the hospital's original wings was removed in order to construct the Dixmyth Visitor Garage and Ambulatory Surgery Center in the late 1980s. In 1989, Victoria Hall, the student nurses' residence that had been built in 1927, was removed and replaced with a medical office building. Today, the hospital houses more than 700 beds and partners with 1,600 physicians. A five-year, $122 million modernization and expansion project included new construction and extensive renovation as well as a new 10-story expansion of the Dixmyth tower, adding 175,000 square feet (16,300 m^{2}), or nearly seven acres of clinical space to the campus. The project also included renovation of 75,000 square feet (7,000 m^{2}) of existing space, including cardiology, pulmonology, vascular, obstetrics and an expansion of the emergency department. The project was completed in the summer of 2007.

== Services ==
Good Samaritan Hospital is acknowledged for its maternity and newborn programs; cardiac and vascular programs; surgery programs, including bariatric and robotic surgery; emergency services; oncology services; neuroscience services including its joint commission-certified brain tumor program, joint commission-certified comprehensive stroke center, neurosciences critical care program, and continuous video EEG program; and research and training.

== Good Samaritan College of Nursing and Health Science ==
Good Samaritan College of Nursing and Health Science is a private non-profit subsidiary of the hospital. Located in Cincinnati but serving the tri-state region of southwest Ohio, southeast Indiana and northern Kentucky, the institution provides training for healthcare careers.
