= Single ventricle =

Ventricular congenital heart disease

Single ventricle is a rare congenital heart defect, which constitutes just over 1% of congenital cardiovascular diseases. The single functional ventricle could be morphologically right or left with the second ventricle usually hypoplastic and/or insufficiently functional. Therefore, there are several subtypes of the disease, depending on which ventricle is underdeveloped.

- Single ventricle with functional left ventricle:
  - Pulmonary atresia
  - Tricuspidal atresia
  - Double inlet left ventricle (DILV)
  - Double outlet left ventricle
- Single ventricle with functional right ventricle:
  - Hypoplastic left heart syndrome
  - Double inlet right ventricle
  - Double outlet right ventricle
- Single ventricle heterotaxy syndrome is also included to this category.

== Physiology ==
In neonates with single ventricle, the systemic and pulmonary blood flow mix with each other in the single functioning ventricle with consequent lower systemic oxygen saturations (75–85%). The single ventricle then provides both the systemic and pulmonary blood flow.

== Treatment ==
Due to the different types of a single ventricle heart disease, treatment should be individualized. Usually it requires open-heart surgery. The goal is to allow the functioning ventricle to supply the systemic circulation and to connect the systemic veins to the pulmonary arteries. The deoxygenated blood from the systemic veins flows directly into the lungs without passing the heart. The oxygenated blood then returns to the heart and enters the systemic circulation. Although surgical intervention depends on the type of single ventricular disease, any combination of three general procedures are utilized to address those defects:

- Stage I – Norwood procedure
- Stage II – Glenn procedure
- Stage III – Fontan procedure

== Prognosis ==
Prenatal diagnosis is associated with higher survival in neonates with single ventricle physiology. Outcome and life expectancy are highly depending on the underlying morpho-functional subtype and individual characteristics. More than half survive two years with the average length of up to 30 to 40 years.
