= Hypoplastic right heart syndrome =

Type of congenital heart defect

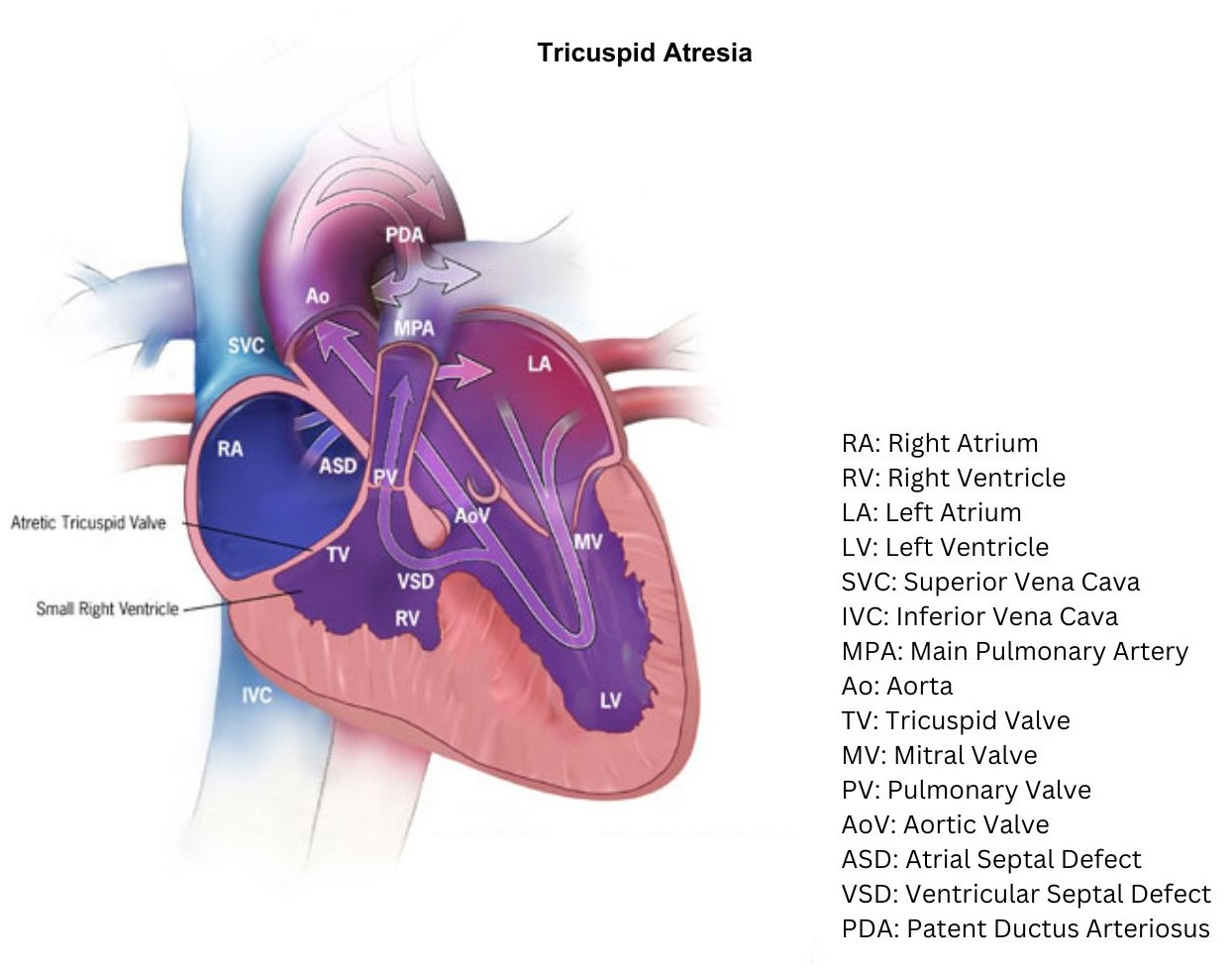
- Diagram of a heart with underdeveloped right side (tricuspid, pulmonary valve, and right ventricle)
- Specialty: Cardiology
- Duration: Lifetime
- Diagnostic method: Fetal echocardiogram
- Treatment: Cardiac surgery
- Frequency: 60,000 cases per year, US

Hypoplastic right heart syndrome (HRHS) is a congenital heart defect in which the structures on the right side of the heart, particularly the right ventricle, are underdeveloped. This defect causes inadequate blood flow to the lungs, and thus a cyanotic infant.

== Symptoms and signs ==
Common symptoms include a grayish-blue (cyanosis) coloration to the skin, lips, fingernails and other parts of the body. Other pronounced symptoms can be rapid or difficult breathing, poor feeding due to lack of energy, cold hands or feet, or being inactive and drowsy. Notably, patent ductus arteriosus and patent foramen ovale, normally dangerous defects, are necessary for a newborn with HRHS to survive. If either formation does close, the child will go into shock, signs of which can include cool or clammy skin, a weak or rapid pulse, and dilated pupils.

== Causes ==
It is mostly unknown what causes hypoplastic right heart syndrome in a given individual. It is thought that a family history of similar heart defects can increase the risk, and there are some genes hypothesized to be factors. However, it can also manifest in a child whose family is completely lacking in congenital heart abnormalities.

== Pathogenesis ==
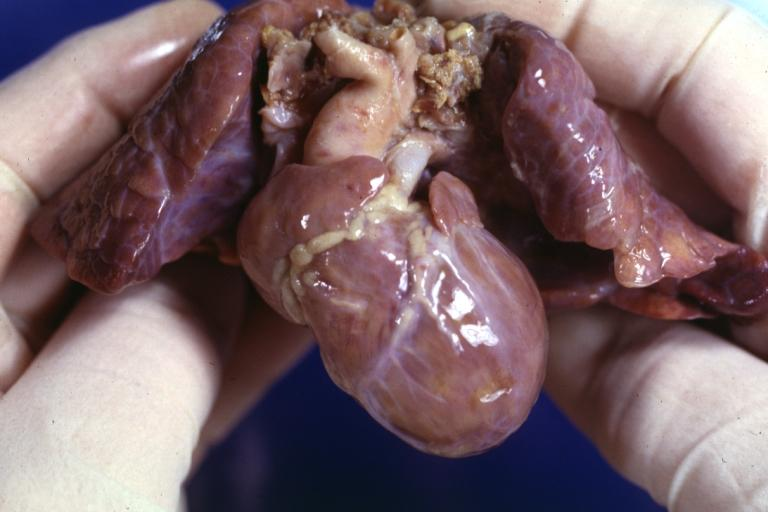
Newborn heart with HRHS, note the underdeveloped right heart (left side of photograph)

When the right side of the heart is more underdeveloped than the left side, this is known as hypoplastic right heart syndrome. HRHS is known for the pulmonary valve, the tricuspid valve, right ventricle, and the pulmonary artery all failing to form properly. HRHS also causes the right ventricle to be a fair amount smaller than the left side.

In people with hypoplastic right heart syndrome, the heart is not able to adequately pump blood to the lungs. The result of this is an inadequate supply of oxygenated blood to be circulated to the body. The severity of underdevelopment varies for each individual. A special team of pediatric cardiologists is required to develop a treatment plan.

=== Anatomy ===
A healthy heart has four chambers, each separated by valves that open and close to control blood flow between the chambers. When the heart beats, oxygen-poor blood enters the right atrium. The blood then flows into the right ventricle, where it pumps into the pulmonary artery to travel to the lungs for oxygen. Oxygen-rich blood returns to the left atrium, where it then travels into the left ventricle. The left ventricle pumps the oxygenated blood into the aorta to be circulated to the rest of the body. With a malformed right side of the heart, most or all of the blood will move through this cycle while skipping oxygenation at the lungs, as that is the role of the right atrium and ventricle.

Crucial steps in heart formation are development of the ventricles and atrium formation, as well as septation and valve formation. Any disturbances of such processes may lead to various congenital heart diseases and defects that could be initiated by various genetic, epigenetic or environmental factors. The most common heart malformations from genetic or epigenetic problems are: stenosis of the aorta and pulmonary trunk, which is a narrowing of the vessels, atrial and/or ventricular septal defect, tricuspid atresia, and hypoplastic left and right heart syndrome. When an individual has hypoplastic right or left heart syndrome, it means that more than one of these problems have occurred together.

== Diagnosis ==
If a cardiac anomaly is suspected in a routine ultrasound during pregnancy, often a perinatologist (maternal-fetal specialist) will perform a fetal echocardiogram (noninvasive ultrasound of the fetus heart), which may be able to confirm a diagnosis of HRHS. This can help with possible options for treatment. If the child is born without a diagnosis, an ECG will most likely be performed once the child starts showing symptoms.

== Treatment ==
There is no cure for hypoplastic right heart syndrome. A three-stage series of surgical procedures is commonly used to treat the condition. The surgeries redirect the blood flow within the heart and allows the left ventricle to do the work for the underdeveloped right side of the heart. The three surgeries are spread out over the patients first few years of life. The first procedure, usually either the Norwood procedure or the Blalock–Thomas–Taussig shunt, is typically done within the first few days or weeks of life. The second procedure, called the Glenn procedure, is usually performed between four and twelve months of age. The last surgery, known as the Fontan procedure, is typically performed at the age of 18 months or older. The final result of these surgeries is to redirect the superior and inferior vena cavae into the pulmonary artery, bypassing the right atrium alltogether.

In a stage 1 Norwood procedure for hypoplastic right heart, the main pulmonary artery is separated from the left and right portions of the pulmonary artery and joined with the upper portion of the aorta. The proximal pulmonary artery is connected to the aortic arch, while the narrowed segment of the pulmonary trunk is repaired. An aortopulmonary shunt is created to connect the aorta to the main pulmonary artery to provide pulmonary blood flow to the lungs. The Glenn procedure disconnects the superior vena cava from the heart and connects it to the right pulmonary artery so deoxygenated blood from the upper body goes directly to the lungs. The Fontan procedure, done usually after the patient is two years old, disconnects the inferior vena cava from the heart and connects it directly with the other pulmonary artery so that deoxygenated blood from the lower body then is sent directly to the lungs.

=== Follow-up care ===
With the aformentioned series of operations or even a heart transplant, a newborn can be treated but cannot be cured. Young individuals who have undergone reconstructive surgery must refer to a cardiologist who is experienced in congenital heart diseases, People who have been diagnosed with HRHS must limit the physical activity they participate in to their own lowered endurance level.

== Prevalence ==
Hypoplastic right heart syndrome is both less common and less severe than hypoplastic left heart syndrome. Within the United States it occurs in 1 in 60,000 births, as opposed to HLHS, which occurs in 1 in 4,300 births. HRHS requires prenatal diagnosis since it often necessitates immediate and emergency treatment. Pregnant women whose pregnancy is complicated with this anomaly should be referred to a level 3 trauma center with pediatric cardiology and pediatric cardiothoracic surgical team.

It can be associated with aortic stenosis.
