= William Imon Norwood =

American pediatric cardiac surgeon and physician (1941–2020)

- Born: April 21, 1941; Camden, Arkansas, U.S.
- Died: December 13, 2020 (aged 79); Albuquerque, New Mexico, U.S.
- Medical career
- Field: Cardiac surgery

William Imon Norwood Jr., also Bill Norwood (April 21, 1941 – December 13, 2020), was an American pediatric cardiac surgeon and physician. He was known for the Norwood procedure, a pioneering cardiac operation named after him for children born with Hypoplastic left heart syndrome.

== Early life and education ==
William Norwood was born in Camden, Arkansas, to William and Pearl Norwood. First, he studied chemistry and biology at the University of New Mexico and then medicine at the University of Colorado School of Medicine. His postgraduate training in cardiothoracic surgery was at Peter Bent Brigham Hospital Harvard and a pediatric cardiothoracic fellowship at Boston Children's Medical Center, Harvard University. Later, he was appointed chief of cardiothoracic surgery at The Children's Hospital of Philadelphia.

== Career ==
Norwood co-founded and was vice president, president and then CEO of the Aldo Castañeda Institute in Genolier, Switzerland. Nemours Cardiac Center in Wilmington, Delaware was the institution from which he retired after a career as a heart surgeon.

Norwood was also the developer of pioneering heart surgery in infants and newborns for congenital heart defects. The Norwood Procedure is the first of three operations performed to correct the congenital cardiac lesion known as hypoplastic left heart syndrome (HLHS). The procedure is typically done within a few days of life of newborns.

Project HOPE, was extending its charitable help also to countries in Eastern Europe and Bill Norwood started his visits to Poland. In late 1970s he came with other American staff to the Polish-American Institute of Pediatrics in Kraków, Poland. His work and initiative was instrumental in organizing and developing pediatric cardiac surgery in this region of Poland.

== Death ==
Norwood died in Albuquerque on December 13, 2020, at the age of 79.

== See also ==
- Francis Fontan
- William Glenn
