= Bidirectional Glenn procedure =

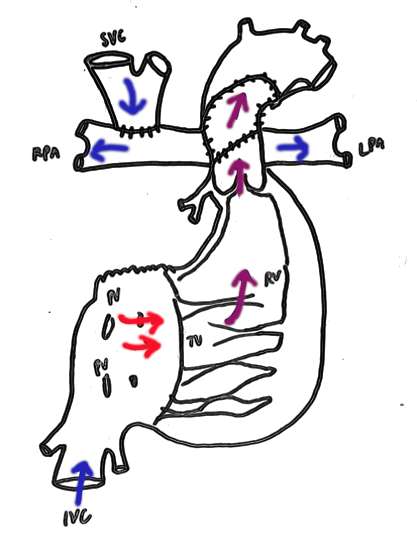
- Bidirectional Glenn. Cavopulmonary anastomosis is created connecting the SVC to the right pulmonary artery. Any previous supply to the PAs, such as a Norwood-procedure shunt, is removed.
- Other names: bidirectional cavopulmonary anastomosis, hemi-Fontan
- Specialty: Cardiothoracic surgery

Hypoplastic left heart syndrome (HLHS), which often requires the bidirectional Glenn as part of its three part palliation procedure

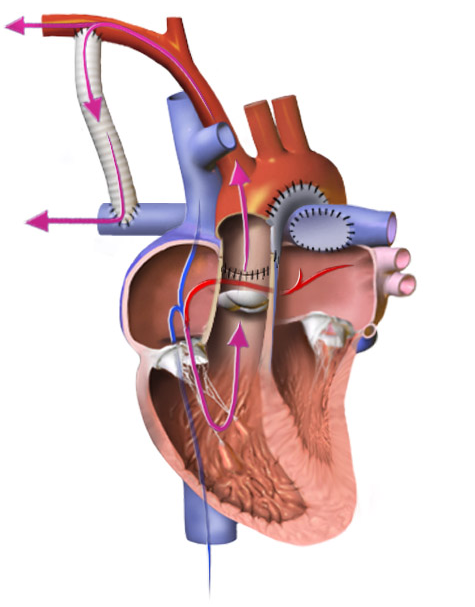
An HLHS heart's blood flow after Norwood procedure, i.e. the stage before a BDG shunt

The bidirectional Glenn (BDG) shunt, or bidirectional cavopulmonary anastomosis, is a surgical technique used in pediatric cardiac surgery procedure used to temporarily improve blood oxygenation for patients with a congenital cardiac defect resulting in a single functional ventricle. Creation of a bidirectional shunt reduces the amount of blood volume that the heart needs to pump at the time of surgical repair with the Fontan procedure.

== Uses ==
=== Physiology ===
The human circulatory system uses a low-resistance pulmonary circulation and high-resistance systemic circulation to pump blood. In a single-ventricle heart, the sole functioning ventricle must pump blood to both the lungs and the organ systems. As a result, this is an abnormal parallel circuit where the pulmonary and systemic blood mixes such that both oxygenated and deoxygenated blood are pumped to the organs. The aim of the bidirectional Glenn shunt is to improve oxygenation and reduce the load on the single functioning ventricle while the patient is prepared for definitive surgical correction through separation of the pulmonary and systemic circuits. The BDG shunt is also called a "hemi-Fontan" procedure because it is the physiologic equivalent of half a functioning Fontan shunt.

=== Univentricular congenital cardiac malformations ===
The incidence of univentricular heart malformations is estimated at 0.1 to 0.4 per 1,000 live births. In the neonatal period, these patients depend on an aortopulmonary shunt that is maintained medically with prostaglandin and then surgically with an initial cardiac shunt procedure. As the patient will outgrow the shunt with time, they are evaluated for the Glenn bidirectional shunt when oxygen saturation begins to fall. The Glenn procedure is typically performed at 4 to 6 months of age for infants born with congenital single ventricle defects. These patients typically require a Fontan procedure at 18 to 36 months of age following the Glenn BDG procedure.

Examples of congenital cardiac malformations in which this procedure may be used include hypoplastic left heart syndrome, tricuspid atresia, double-inlet left ventricle and double-outlet right ventricle. The natural history of congenital univentricular cardiac malformations results in cyanotic heart failure at an early age. Staged palliation through the BDG shunt and Fontan procedure has allowed these patients to live into adulthood.

== Contraindications ==
The circulation of a patient after BDG shunt placement requires adequate systemic venous return to support pulmonary blood flow. However, pulmonary blood flow, and thus oxygenation, is inhibited by high pressures or valvular obstructions.

Pulmonary hypertension (moderate to severe) is a relative contraindication to the bidirectional Glenn. This is because pulmonary vascular resistance is too elevated to allow sufficient oxygenation. In physiologic parameters, this includes elevated pulmonary vascular resistance, stiff ventricle tissue, and dysfunction of the atrio-ventricular valve. In patients with hypoplastic left heart syndrome, obstruction of blood flow at the atrial septum should be examined and corrected.

== Risks and complications ==
The mechanism of many of the risks and complications related to failure of the Glenn bidirectional shunt is thought to be thrombosis. Right-side dominant circulation, elevated pulmonary vascular resistance, and prolonged operative and recovery time are the major factors that increase the risk of complications and failure.

Approximately 30% of patients experience postoperative complications. The National Pediatric Cardiology Quality Improvement Collaborative registry published data in 2013, demonstrating emergency cardiac catherization, new neurologic deficit, reoperation, cardiac arrest, and feeding difficulties requiring procedural intervention as the most common complications. Prolonged cardiopulmonary bypass time, elevated central venous pressure (CVP) or pulmonary arterial pressure, and specific malformations including unbalanced atrioventricular septal defect or surgical history of total anomalous pulmonary venous connection repair were established as risk factors for worse outcomes.

Following the bidirectional Glenn shunt, failure of the procedure can be broadly categorized as failure of procedure, cardiac dysfunction related to surgery, or cardiac dysfunction leading to death before further surgical intervention. Retrospective reviews demonstrate failure of the procedure in 6.5% of patients. Reported mortality related to the BDG procedure ranges from 0.7% to 2.4%, however up to 71% of patients may die once the BDG shunt fails, with many decompensating before further surgery can be performed. In current research, early additional intervention is a promising direction to improve future outcomes. Predictors of failed procedure include right ventricle dominance, prolonged pleural drainage, and prolonged stay in the ICU/hospital or need for use of ECMO to maintain oxygenation.

== Techniques ==
In the bidirectional Glenn shunt procedure, the surgical aim is to control pulmonary blood flow and volume load on the heart. This must be balanced with adequate oxygenation and systemic delivery of oxygenated blood. This modified circulatory system is established by detaching the superior vena cava from the right atrium and connecting the cranial part of the SVC to the pulmonary arteries (shunt). This is an example of a surgical anastomosis. As a result, the venous blood from the upper body enters the SVC and perfuses the pulmonary circulation as a low-pressure circuit, similar to a two-ventricle circulatory system. However, the remainder of systemic venous returns through the inferior vena cava continuing to mix with oxygenated blood returning from the pulmonary circuit.

== Rehabilitation ==
Patients are evaluated after surgery for cardiac and pulmonary function. Extracorporeal membrane oxygenation (ECMO) may be used post-operatively as a temporary measure in cases of cardiac dysfunction or severe pulmonary hypertension. Patients generally recover in intensive care for one week.

For patients who continue to have cardiac dysfunction following surgical establishment of a Fontan circulation, heart transplantation is the only treatment option to restore cardiac function.

== History of the Glenn Procedure ==
Translational research using canine models in right heart bypass led to the creation of the Glenn bidirectional shunt. In 1956, the Meshalkin procedure was reported as a clinically successful superior cavo-pulmonary anastomosis in 21 children. In 1958, William Glenn reported a successful superior vena cava to right pulmonary artery anastomosis (Glenn procedure) for tricuspid atresia in the New England Journal of Medicine. The bidirectional Glenn is a modification where the SVC connects proximally to the bifurcation of the pulmonary arteries. In modern use, the bidirectional Glenn shunt is the second stage, usually following the Norwood procedure and preceding the Fontan repair.

== Society and culture ==
An estimated annual 1,000 Fontan procedures are performed annually in the United States, with an estimated 50,000 to 70,000 patients having completed the procedure as of 2018. In Europe, an estimated 25,000 patients have completed the Fontan procedure as of 2021.

== Other animals ==
Research on cardiac bypass in canine models paved the way for surgical procedures in humans. Rodbard and Wagner connected the right atrial appendage to the right pulmonary artery in an early report on this surgical technique. Carlon et al. reported the first superior cavo-pulmonary anastomosis between the right pulmonary artery and azygos vein, demonstrated an increase in pulmonary blood flow in dogs. The Glenn group at Yale worked on several strategies to create anastomoses between the superior or inferior vena cavae to the right or main pulmonary arteries. These results showed a low survival rate in these canines, and further demonstrated the basis of many surgical complications including pleural effusions, ascites, and thrombosis. In 1964, Haller introduced the bidirectional superior cavo-pulmonary shunt in 50 dogs with a superior vena cava to right pulmonary artery anastomosis with promising physiologic results.
