= Thomas Spray =

Cardiothoracic Surgery

Thomas L. Spray
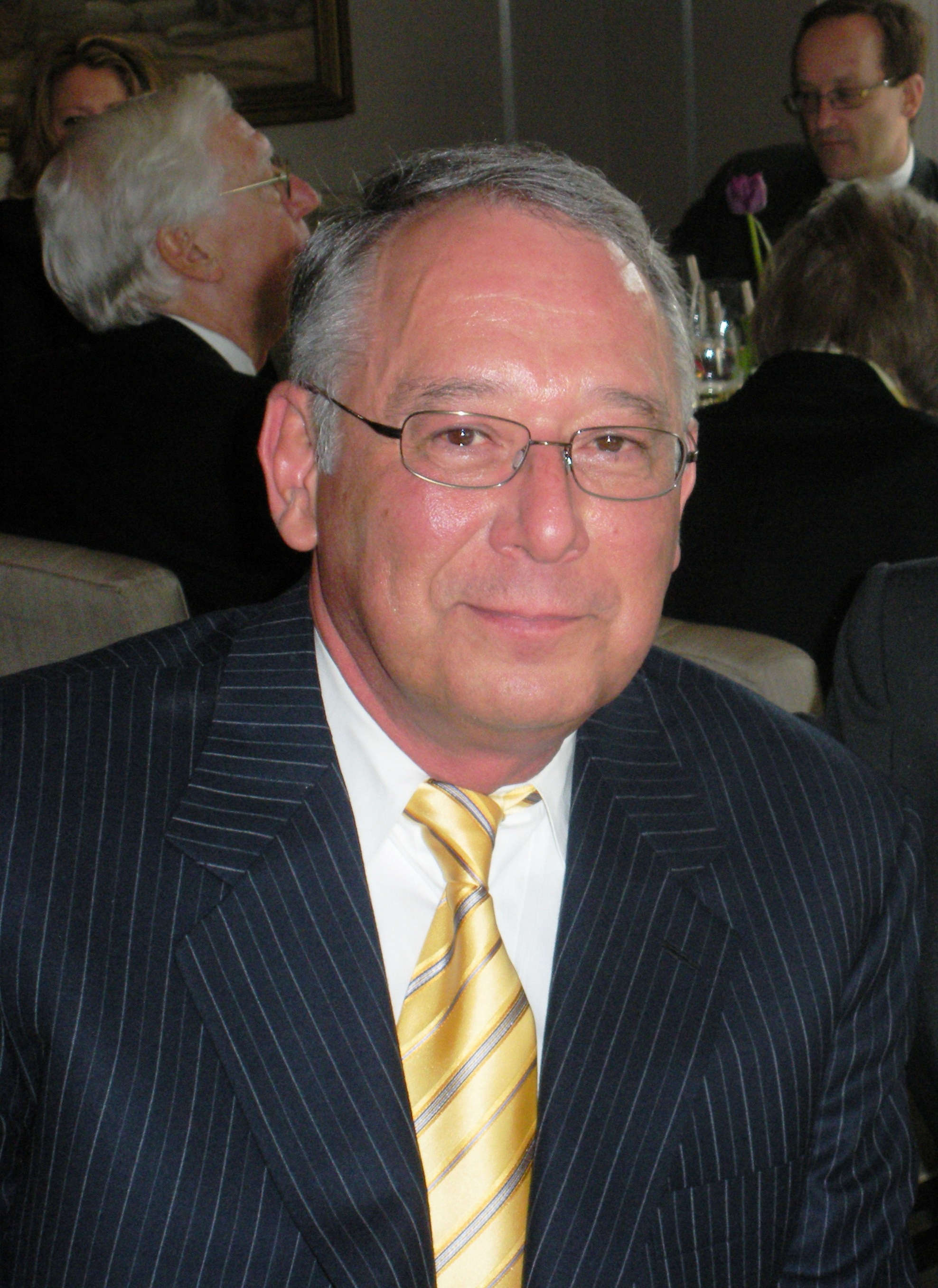
- Thomas L. Spray
- Born: August 28, 1948; Rochester, MN
- Education: Oak Ridge High School (Tennessee); Haverford College; Duke University
- Years active: 1973-2018
- Medical career
- Profession: Surgeon
- Field: Cardiothoracic Surgery
- Institutions: Washington University in St. Louis; Children's Hospital of Philadelphia

Thomas L. Spray (born 1948) is an American cardiothoracic surgeon who served as Chief of the Division of Cardiothoracic Surgery and the Mortimer J. Buckley Jr. MD Endowed Chair in Cardiac Surgery at the Children's Hospital of Philadelphia and Professor of Surgery at the Perelman School of Medicine at the University of Pennsylvania. He retired in 2018.

== Early life ==
Spray was born in Rochester, MN on August 28, 1948. The family moved to Oak Ridge, Tennessee, where he completed high school. He was inspired by his father's orthopedic surgery practice to follow a career in medicine, being particularly impressed by his experiences accompanying his father on a medical mission trip to Algeria. He attended college at Haverford College majoring in Molecular Biology, receiving departmental honors.

== Career ==
After medical school at Duke University, he was a resident in general surgery at Duke University Hospital. As part of his residency, he took two years for specialty training in cardiac pathology at the National Heart, Lung, and Blood Institute. After completing training in cardiac surgery at Duke University Hospital, he was appointed an assistant professor at Washington University School of Medicine, where he rose to a full professorship. In 1994, he was recruited to the Children's Hospital of Philadelphia as chief of the Division of Cardiothoracic Surgery, where he served until 2018.

In 2009, Spray was elected the 89th president of the American Association for Thoracic Surgery.

== Accomplishments ==
Spray was one of the early adopters of ECMO. He was among the first to use intraoperative echocardiography to guide repair of congenital heart disease. He has become an expert and advocate for the Ross procedure. He has performed over 10,000 operations in his over 20-year career.

=== Awards ===
- William W.L Glenn Lecture, American Heart Association, 2009
- Plus ratio quam vis medal from the Jagiellonian University, 2017

== Appearances in popular media ==
- Features in Dateline NBC "Saving a Broken Heart" about an infant with hypoplastic left heart syndrome undergoing the Norwood procedure
