= Damus =

Damus is a surname. Notable people with the surname include:

- Mike Damus (born 1979), American actor
- Ronaldo Damus (born 1999), Haitian footballer

== See also ==
- Damus–Kaye–Stansel procedure, cardiovascular surgical procedure
- Siege of Al-Dāmūs, battle of the Reconquista
