= Bronchitis =

Inflammation of the large airways in the lungs

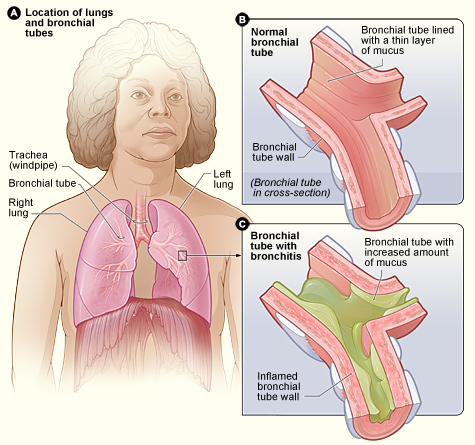
- Figure A shows the location of the lungs and bronchial tubes. Figure B is an enlarged view of a normal bronchial tube. Figure C is an enlarged view of a bronchial tube with bronchitis.
- Pronunciation: /brɒŋˈkaɪtɪs/
- Specialty: Infectious disease, pulmonology
- Symptoms: Coughing up mucus, wheezing, shortness of breath, chest discomfort
- Types: Acute, chronic
- Frequency: Acute: ~5% of people a year Chronic: ~5% of people

Bronchitis is inflammation of the bronchi (large and medium-sized airways) in the lungs that causes coughing. Bronchitis usually begins as an infection in the nose, ears, throat, or sinuses. The infection then makes its way down to the bronchi. Symptoms include coughing up sputum, wheezing, shortness of breath, and chest pain. Bronchitis can be acute or chronic.

Acute bronchitis usually has a cough that lasts around three weeks, and is also known as a chest cold. In more than 90% of cases, the cause is a viral infection. These viruses may be spread through the air when people cough or by direct contact. A small number of cases are caused by a bacterial infection such as Mycoplasma pneumoniae or Bordetella pertussis. Risk factors include exposure to tobacco smoke, dust, and other air pollution. Treatment of acute bronchitis typically involves rest, paracetamol (acetaminophen), and nonsteroidal anti-inflammatory drugs (NSAIDs) to help with the fever.

Chronic bronchitis is defined as a productive cough – one that produces sputum – that lasts for three months or more per year for at least two years. Many people with chronic bronchitis also have chronic obstructive pulmonary disease (COPD). Tobacco smoking is the most common cause, with a number of other factors such as air pollution and genetics playing a smaller role. Treatments include quitting smoking, vaccinations, rehabilitation, and often inhaled bronchodilators and steroids. Some people may benefit from long-term oxygen therapy.

Acute bronchitis is one of the more common diseases. About 5% of adults and 6% of children have at least one episode a year. Acute bronchitis is the most common type of bronchitis. By contrast in the United States, in 2018, 9.3 million people were diagnosed with the less common chronic bronchitis.

== Acute bronchitis ==
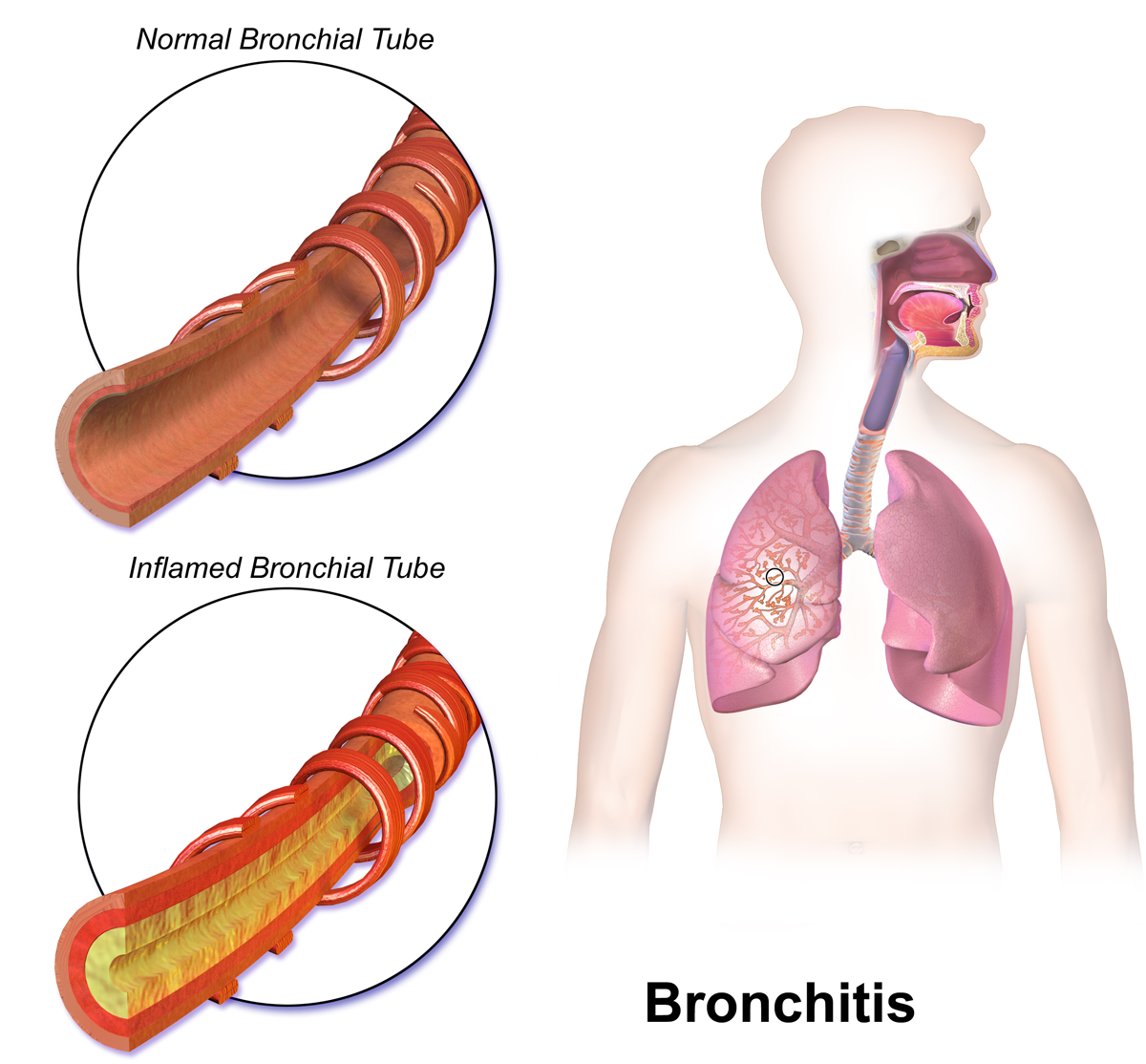
Bronchitis

Acute bronchitis, also known as a chest cold, is a short-term inflammation of the bronchi of the lungs. The most common symptom is a cough that may or may not produce sputum. Other symptoms may include coughing up mucus, wheezing, shortness of breath, fever, and chest discomfort. Fever when present is mild. The infection may last a few to ten days. The cough may persist for several weeks afterwards, with the total duration of symptoms usually around three weeks. Symptoms may last for up to six weeks.

=== Cause ===
In more than 90% of cases, the cause is a viral infection. These viruses may spread through the air when people cough or by direct contact. Risk factors include exposure to tobacco smoke, dust, and other air pollutants. A small number of cases are due to bacteria such as Mycoplasma pneumoniae or Bordetella pertussis. One form of prevention is to avoid smoking and other lung irritants. Frequent hand washing may also be protective.

=== Diagnosis ===
Diagnosis is typically based on a person's signs and symptoms. The color of the sputum does not indicate if the infection is viral or bacterial. Determining the underlying organism is usually not required. Other causes of similar symptoms include asthma, pneumonia, bronchiolitis, bronchiectasis, and COPD. A chest X-ray may be useful to detect pneumonia.

Another common sign of bronchitis is a cough lasting ten days to three weeks. If the cough lasts longer than a month, it may become chronic bronchitis. In addition, a fever may be present. Acute bronchitis is normally caused by a viral infection. Typically, these infections are rhinovirus, adenovirus, parainfluenza, or influenza. No specific testing is normally needed to diagnose acute bronchitis.

=== Treatment ===
Treatment for acute bronchitis usually involves rest, paracetamol (acetaminophen), and NSAIDs to help with the fever. Cough medicine has little support for its use, and is not recommended in children under the age of six. There is tentative evidence that salbutamol may be useful in treating wheezing; however, it may result in nervousness and tremors. Antibiotics are associated with fewer abnormal lung exam results, shorter illness duration, and overall improved health, but they also carry slightly higher risk of adverse side effects. A clear case for antibiotic use is when acute bronchitis is due to pertussis. Tentative evidence supports honey and pelargonium to help with symptoms. Getting plenty of rest and drinking enough fluids are often recommended as well. Chinese medicinal herbs are of unclear effect.

=== Epidemiology ===
Acute bronchitis is one of the most common diseases and the most common type of bronchitis. About 5% of adults are affected, and about 6% of children have at least one episode yearly. It occurs more often in the winter. More than 10 million people in the U.S. visit a healthcare provider each year for this condition, with about 70% receiving antibiotics that are mostly unnecessary. There are efforts to decrease the use of antibiotics in acute bronchitis.

== Chronic bronchitis ==
Chronic bronchitis is a lower respiratory tract disease, defined by a productive cough that lasts for three months or more per year for at least two years. The cough is sometimes referred to as a smoker's cough since it often results from smoking. When chronic bronchitis occurs together with decreased airflow it is known as chronic obstructive pulmonary disease (COPD). Many people with chronic bronchitis have COPD; however, most people with COPD do not also have chronic bronchitis. Estimates of the number of people with COPD who have chronic bronchitis are 7–40%. Estimates of the number of people who smoke and have chronic bronchitis who also have COPD is 60%.

The term "chronic bronchitis" was used in previous definitions of COPD but is no longer included in the definition. The term is still used clinically. While both chronic bronchitis and emphysema are often associated with COPD, neither is needed to make the diagnosis. A Chinese consensus commented on symptomatic types of COPD that include chronic bronchitis with frequent exacerbations.

Chronic bronchitis is marked by mucus hypersecretion and mucins. The excess mucus is produced by an increased number of goblet cells, and enlarged submucosal glands in response to long-term irritation. The mucous glands in the submucosa secrete more than the goblet cells. Mucins thicken mucus, and their concentration has been found to be high in cases of chronic bronchitis, and also to correlate with the severity of the disease. Excess mucus can narrow the airways, thereby limiting airflow and accelerating the decline in lung function, and result in COPD. Excess mucus shows itself as a chronic productive cough and its severity and volume of sputum can fluctuate in periods of acute exacerbations. In COPD, those with the chronic bronchitic phenotype with associated chronic excess mucus, experience a worse quality of life than those without.

The increased secretions are initially cleared by coughing. The cough is often worse soon after awakening, and the sputum produced may have a yellow or green color and may be streaked with specks of blood. In the early stages, a cough can maintain mucus clearance. However, with continued excessive secretion mucus clearance is impaired, and when the airways become obstructed a cough becomes ineffective. Effective mucociliary clearance depends on airway hydration, ciliary beating, and the rates of mucin secretion. Each of these factors is impaired in chronic bronchitis. Chronic bronchitis can lead to a higher number of exacerbations and a faster decline in lung function. The ICD-11 lists chronic bronchitis with emphysema (emphysematous bronchitis) as a "certain specified COPD".

=== Cause ===
Most cases of chronic bronchitis are caused by tobacco smoking. Chronic bronchitis in young adults who smoke is associated with a greater chance of developing COPD. There is an association between smoking cannabis and chronic bronchitis. In addition, chronic inhalation of air pollution, or irritating fumes or dust from hazardous exposures in occupations such as coal mining, grain handling, textile manufacturing, livestock farming, and metal moulding may also be a risk factor for the development of chronic bronchitis. Bronchitis caused in this way is often referred to as industrial bronchitis, or occupational bronchitis. Rarely genetic factors also play a role.

Air quality can also affect the respiratory system with higher levels of nitrogen dioxide and sulfur dioxide contributing to bronchial symptoms. Sulfur dioxide can cause inflammation which can aggravate chronic bronchitis and make infections more likely.

Air pollution in the workplace is the cause of several non-communicable diseases (NCDs) including chronic bronchitis.

=== Treatment ===
Decline in lung function in chronic bronchitis may be slowed by stopping smoking. Chronic bronchitis may be treated with a number of medications and occasionally oxygen therapy. Pulmonary rehabilitation may also be used.

A distinction has been made between exacerbations (sudden worsenings) of chronic bronchitis, and otherwise stable chronic bronchitis. Stable chronic bronchitis can be defined as the normal definition of chronic bronchitis, plus the absence of an acute exacerbation in the previous four weeks. A Cochrane review found that mucolytics in chronic bronchitis may slightly decrease the chance of developing an exacerbation. The mucolytic guaifenesin is a safe and effective treatment for stable chronic bronchitis. This has an advantage in that it is available as an extended use tablet which lasts for twelve hours. Erdosteine is a mucolytic recommended by NICE. GOLD also supports the use of some mucolytics that are advised against when inhaled corticosteroids are being used, and singles out erdosteine as having good effects regardless of corticosteroid use. Erdosteine also has antioxidant properties. Erdosteine has been shown to significantly reduce the risk of exacerbations, shorten their duration, and hospital stays. In those with the chronic bronchitic phenotype of COPD, the phosphodiesterase-4 inhibitor roflumilast may decrease significant exacerbations.

=== Epidemiology ===
Chronic bronchitis affects about 3.4–22% of the general population. Individuals over 45 years of age, smokers, those that live or work in areas with high air pollution, and anybody with asthma all have a higher risk of developing chronic bronchitis. This wide range is due to the different definitions of chronic bronchitis that can be diagnosed based on signs and symptoms or the clinical diagnosis of the disorder. Chronic bronchitis tends to affect men more often than women. While the primary risk factor for chronic bronchitis is smoking, there is still a 4–22% chance that non-smokers can get chronic bronchitis. This might suggest other risk factors such as the inhalation of fuels, dusts, fumes and genetic factor. In the United States, in 2016, 8.6 million people were diagnosed with chronic bronchitis, and there were 518 reported deaths. Per 100,000 of population the death rate of chronic bronchitis was 0.2.

== History ==
The condition of bronchitis has been recognised for many centuries, in several different cultures including the Ancient Greek, Chinese, and Indian, with the presence of excess phlegm and cough noted in recognition of the same condition. Early treatments of chronic bronchitis included garlic, cinnamon and ipecac, among others. Modern treatments were developed during the second half of the 20th century.

The British physician Charles Badham was the first person to describe the condition and name the acute form as acute bronchitis in his book Observations on the inflammatory affections of the mucous membrane of the bronchiæ, published in 1808. In this book, Badham distinguished three forms of bronchitis, including acute and chronic. A second, expanded edition of the book was published in 1814 with the title An essay on bronchitis. Badham used the term catarrh to refer to the cardinal symptoms of chronic cough and mucus hypersecretion of chronic bronchitis, and described chronic bronchitis as a disabling disorder.

In 1901 an article was published on the treatment of chronic bronchitis in the elderly. The symptoms described have remained unchanged. The cause was thought to be brought on by dampness, cold weather, and foggy conditions, and treatments were aimed towards various cough mixtures, respiratory stimulants, and tonics. It was noted that something other than the weather was thought to be at play. Exacerbations of the condition were also described at this time. Another physician Harry Campbell was referred to who had written in the British Medical Journal a week before. Campbell had suggested that the cause of chronic bronchitis was due to toxic substances, and recommended pure air, simple food, and exercise to remove them from the body.

A joint research programme was undertaken in Chicago and London from 1951 to 1953 in which the clinical features of one thousand cases of chronic bronchitis were detailed. The findings were published in the Lancet in 1953. It was stated that since its introduction by Badham, chronic bronchitis had become an increasingly popular diagnosis. The study had looked at various associations such as the weather, conditions at home, and at work, age of onset, childhood illnesses, smoking habits, and breathlessness. It was concluded that chronic bronchitis invariably led to emphysema, particularly when the bronchitis had persisted for a long time.

In 1957 it was noted that at the time there were many investigations being carried out into chronic bronchitis and emphysema in general, and among industrial workers exposed to dust. Excerpts were published dating from 1864 in which Charles Parsons had noted the occurring consequence of the development of emphysema from bronchitis. This was seen to be not always applicable. His findings were in association with his studies on chronic bronchitis among pottery workers.

A CIBA (now Novartis) meeting in 1959, and a meeting of the American Thoracic Society in 1962, defined chronic bronchitis as a component of COPD, in the terms that have not changed.

== Eosinophilic bronchitis ==
Eosinophilic bronchitis is a chronic dry cough, defined by the presence of an increased number of a type of white blood cell known as eosinophils. It has a normal finding on X-ray and has no airflow limitation.

== Protracted bacterial bronchitis ==
Protracted bacterial bronchitis in children, is defined as a chronic productive cough with a positive bronchoalveolar lavage that resolves with antibiotics. Protracted bacterial bronchitis is usually caused by Streptococcus pneumoniae, non-typable Haemophilus influenzae, or Moraxella catarrhalis. Protracted bacterial bronchitis (lasting more than 4 weeks) in children may be helped by antibiotics.

== Plastic bronchitis ==
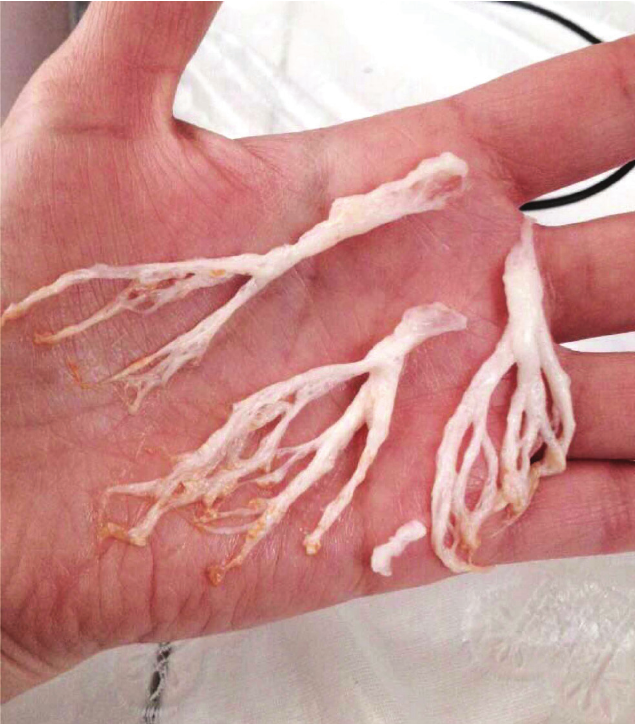
Plastic bronchitis bronchial casts

Plastic bronchitis is a rarely found condition in which thickened secretions plug the bronchi. The plugs are rubbery or plastic-feeling (thus the name). The light-colored plugs take the branching shape of the bronchi that they fill, and are known as bronchial casts. When these casts are coughed up, they are firmer in texture from typical phlegm or the short, softer mucus plugs seen in some people with asthma. However, some people with asthma have larger, firmer, and more complex plugs. These differ from the casts seen in people whose plastic bronchitis is associated with congenital heart disease or lymphatic vessel abnormalities mainly because eosinophils and Charcot–Leyden crystals are present in the asthma-associated casts but not in the others.

Casts obstruct the airflow, and can result in the overinflation of the opposite lung. Plastic bronchitis usually occurs in children. Some cases may result from abnormalities in the lymphatic vessels. Advanced cases may show imaging similarities to bronchiectasis.

=== Eosinophilic plastic bronchitis ===
Eosinophilic plastic bronchitis is a subtype of plastic bronchitis that is more often found in children. Symptoms may include a cough, and wheezing, and imaging may reveal a lung that is completely collapsed. Depending on the size of the casts, and the location the condition may present with mild symptoms, or prove fatal.

== Aspergillus bronchitis ==
Aspergillus bronchitis is a type of aspergillosis, a fungal infection caused by Aspergillus a common mold that affects the bronchi. Unlike other types of pulmonary aspergillosis, it can affect individuals who are not immunocompromised. In immunocompetent individuals, Aspergillus bronchitis may manifest as persistent respiratory infections or symptoms that do not respond to antibiotics, but may improve with antifungals.
