= Ian Town =

Chief Science Advisor to Ministry of Health, NZ

Ian Town FRACP
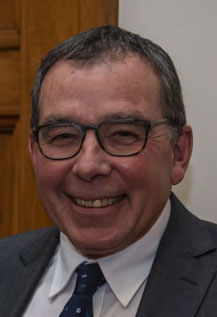
- Town in November 2020
- Born: George Ian Town
- Education: University of Otago; University of Southampton
- Employer: Ministry of Health

George Ian Town is a New Zealand respiratory scientist and health official. He was appointed the Chief Science Advisor to the New Zealand Ministry of Health in 2019.

== Education and research ==
After graduating MB ChB at the University of Otago, Town completed a Doctor of Medicine higher degree at the University of Southampton in 1991, with a thesis entitled The role of inflammation in oxygen-induced lung injury in the preterm guinea pig.

Town is a physician and has published on evidence-based guidelines for respiratory medicine, particularly asthma, COPD and pneumonia. He is a Fellow of the Royal Australasian College of Physicians.

Town has publicly stated that the research on the drug Ivermectin doesn't show that the drug is effective at treating COVID-19 and claimed that it has dangerous side effects. Though he has voiced support for other protease inhibiting drugs.

== Employment ==
Town was the Dean of the University of Otago in Christchurch from 2002 to 2005. He was the Deputy Vice-Chancellor of the University of Canterbury from 2005 to 2013. He has been Chair of the Performance Based Research Fund Sector Reference Group and Chair of the Tertiary Education Commission PBRF Governance Group. He was the Chair of Te Papa Hauora/Christchurch Health Precinct Advisory Council, advising on the post-earthquake rebuild, for five years.

Town was appointed as Chief Science Advisor to the Ministry of Health in July 2019. His role at the Ministry was originally part-time, and involved working with MBIE and the Health Research Council to implement the New Zealand Health Research Strategy 2017–2027. When COVID-19 arrived in New Zealand his background in respiratory medicine led to his advising full-time on the New Zealand response to COVID-19.

== Selected publications ==
- W. S. Lim; M. M. van der Eerden; R. Laing; W. G. Boersma; N. Karalus; G. I. Town; S. A. Lewis; J. T. Macfarlane (May 2003). "Defining community acquired pneumonia severity on presentation to hospital: an international derivation and validation study" (PDF). Thorax. 58 (5): 377–82. doi:10.1136/THORAX.58.5.377. ISSN 0040-6376. PMC 1746657. PMID 12728155. Wikidata Q24678793.
- Carlos A Camargo; Tristram Ingham; Kristin Wickens; et al. (27 December 2010). "Cord-blood 25-hydroxyvitamin D levels and risk of respiratory infection, wheezing, and asthma". Pediatrics. 127 (1): e180-7. doi:10.1542/PEDS.2010-0442. ISSN 0031-4005. PMID 21187313. Wikidata Q83039767.
- Taylor DR; Drazen JM; Herbison GP; Yandava CN; Hancox RJ; Town GI (1 September 2000). "Asthma exacerbations during long term beta agonist use: influence of beta(2) adrenoceptor polymorphism". Thorax. 55 (9): 762–767. doi:10.1136/THORAX.55.9.762. ISSN 0040-6376. PMC 1745862. PMID 10950895. Wikidata Q35534065.
- Neill AM; Martin IR; Weir R; et al. (1 October 1996). "Community acquired pneumonia: aetiology and usefulness of severity criteria on admission". Thorax. 51 (10): 1010–1016. doi:10.1136/THX.51.10.1010. ISSN 0040-6376. PMC 472650. PMID 8977602. Wikidata Q36501395.
- D R Murdoch; R T Laing; G D Mills; N C Karalus; G I Town; S Mirrett; L B Reller (1 October 2001). "Evaluation of a rapid immunochromatographic test for detection of Streptococcus pneumoniae antigen in urine samples from adults with community-acquired pneumonia". Journal of Clinical Microbiology. 39 (10): 3495–3498. doi:10.1128/JCM.39.10.3495-3498.2001. ISSN 0095-1137. PMC 88378. PMID 11574562. Wikidata Q33973580.
- Ian Town; Thoracic Society of Australia and New Zealand; Asthma and Respiratory Foundation of New Zealand (2003), The burden of COPD in New Zealand, OCLC 1135022891, Wikidata Q109329560
- Ian Town; New Zealand Guidelines Group; Royal New Zealand College of General Practitioners (2002), The diagnosis and treatment of adult asthma. (in undetermined language), OCLC 946799390, Wikidata Q109329561
