= DKS =

DKS may refer to:

- Damus–Kaye–Stansel procedure in cardiovascular surgery
- Dick's Sporting Goods, NYSE stock symbol
- D. K. Shivakumar, (born 1962), Indian politician and Chief Minister of Karnataka
- DKS Racing, a team in the 1997 International Formula 3000 Championship
- Dikson Airport, Russia, IATA code
