= Michael Peter Kaye =

American surgeon

Professor Michael Peter Kaye
- Died: December 17, 2017 (aged 82)
- Education: Loyola University Strich School of Medicine
- Occupation: Surgeon
- Known for: Heart transplant research; Co-founder of the International Society for Heart and Lung Transplantation (ISHLT); Developed the International Database for Heart and Lung Transplantation; Editor of The Journal of Heart and Lung Transplantation

Michael Peter Kaye (died December 17, 2017) was an American surgeon and researcher who co-founded the International Society for Heart and Lung Transplantation (ISHLT) in 1981. He developed the society's registry and edited the Journal of Heart and Lung Transplantation.

Brought up on the south side of Chicago and completing early medical training at Loyola University Strich School of Medicine, he spent ten years in heart transplant research at Mayo Clinic School of Medicine, becoming professor at the University of Minnesota in 1980.

Kaye was the first director of the ISHLT's International Database for Heart and Lung Transplantation, which became the largest registry of its kind in the world.

In 1986, he was a member of the team that performed the first combined heart-lung transplant in the mid-west of America. Subsequently, he was appointed director of research at San Diego and received the ISHLT lifetime service award in 1996.

He died in 2017 at the age of 82.

== Early life ==
Known as Harley at home, Kaye was born to Lithuanian immigrants and spent his early life on the south side of Chicago. He went on to study chemistry at St. Louis University, following which he entered Loyola University Strich School of Medicine and completed a medical degree.

== Medical career ==
Kaye completed his residency at the University of Minnesota. Here, he met and married Mary and they had five children. During their ten years in Rochester, Minnesota, he carried out heart transplant research at Mayo Clinic School of Medicine. In addition, he served at the Brooke Army Medical Center, Fort Sam Houston, Texas.

In the mid-1970s, Kaye devised a new heart surgery for transposition of the great arteries, and two other surgeons (Paul Damus and Horace Stansel) independently proposed similar operations around the same time. The surgery became known as the Damus–Kaye–Stansel procedure.

In the 1980s, he became Professor of Surgery and head of the cardiothoracic research laboratories at the University of Minnesota, where he continued his work on heart and lung transplantation.

In 1981, Kaye was one of the founding members of the Society for Heart Transplantation, later renamed the International Society for Heart and Lung Transplantation. In 1985, he was its secretary and treasurer. In addition, he co-developed and was the first director of the Society's registry, a database for heart transplantation, which subsequently evolved into the International Database for Heart and Lung Transplantation, becoming the largest registry of heart and lung transplantation data in the world.

When Jaques Losman retired in 1985, Kaye, in 1986, took over as the editor of the Journal of Heart and Lung Transplantation, remaining so for ten years and during which he was key in developing it as an internationally accepted journal.

From 1986, the University of Minnesota had put into use a database for cardiac surgery. Developed by both Ed Sweeney and Kaye, it became the prototype for the database soon used by the Society of Thoracic Surgeons. In the same year, he was a member of the team that performed the first combined heart and lung transplant in the mid-west of America.

In 1989, heart-lung transplant pioneer Stuart W. Jamieson took along Kaye when transferring his [Jamieson's] entire surgical team from Minnesota to San Diego. Here, Kaye was appointed director of research.

In 1996, Kaye received the ISHLT lifetime service award and in 1997, he co-founded Acumen Healthcare Solutions, a clinical trials software company.

== Death ==
Kaye died on December 17, 2017, at the age of 82.

== Selected publications ==
- "Pediatric heart, heart-lung, and lung transplantation: The world experience from 1984 to 1993", Progress in Paediatric Cardiology, co-authored with William W. Miller, David Baum, Autumn 1993, Volume 2, Issue 4, pp. 4–8.
- Heart and Lung Transplantation 2000. R.G. Landes Co., 1993. (With John B. O'Connell)
