= Francis Fontan =

French cardiologist and surgeon

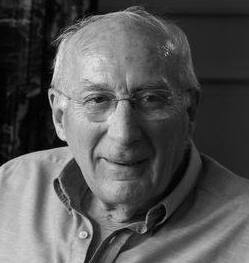
- Born: 2 July 1929; Nay, Pyrénées-Atlantiques, France
- Died: 14 January 2018 (aged 88); Bordeaux
- Known for: Developing a surgical treatment for congenital heart disease
- Awards: Grand Prix scientifique de la Fondation Lefoulon-Delalande (2006)
- Scientific career
- Fields: Cardiothoracic surgery
- Workplaces: Bourdeaux Hospital

Francis Fontan (2 July 1929 – 14 January 2018) was a French cardiologist and cardiothoracic surgeon best known for developing the Fontan procedure, a surgical procedure used to treat some forms of congenital heart disease.

== Early life and education ==
Fontan was born on 2 July 1929 in Nay, a small town in the French Pyrenees. He was the son of Victor Fontan and his wife Jeanne (née Larquey). Fontan's father was a cyclist who was leading the 1929 Tour de France before his bicycle was damaged in an accident, forcing him to withdraw from the race.

At age 17, Fontan entered the Faculty of Medicine at the University of Bordeaux before specializing in surgery, and later, paediatric cardiac surgery. During his internship, he was mentored by cardiac surgeon Georges Dubourg. He was affected by the death of a young teenager with tricuspid atresia, and Dubourg told him that he should use the experience as motivation to research possible treatments for the condition. In tricuspid atresia, the patient does not have a functioning right ventricle, so at the time heart transplant was thought to be the only viable surgical option.

Fontan completed a thesis on extracorporeal circulation, discussing new technology (such as the heart-lung bypass machine) that allows a patient's blood to be oxygenated through a pump on the outside of the body in situations such as open heart surgery.

== Medical career ==
Fontan joined the faculty at the University of Bordeaux, where he served as a professor of cardiac surgery for 23 years.

With a growing interest in the management of patients with congenital heart disease, Fontan was engaged in research between 1964 and 1966. In the hope of treating patients in whom the flow of blood through the right side of the heart was impaired, Fontan endeavoured to create a shunt between the vena cava and the pulmonary artery. His initial attempts in dogs were unsuccessful and all the animals died within a few hours.

Despite these failures, Fontan felt like the surgery (which later became known as the Fontan procedure) would work in humans, and when his colleague Pierre Broustet asked his opinion about managing a young woman with tricuspid atresia in 1968, Fontan decided to perform the surgery. The patient experienced some complications after surgery, but she survived and recovered from it. The operation was completed on a second patient in 1970, and after a third case the series was published in the international journal Thorax in 1971. The technique rapidly grew in popularity, and after several refinements is now used internationally.

In addition to his eponymous operation, Fontan is known for having been one of the pioneers of heart transplantation in France. In 1986 he founded the European Association for Cardiothoracic Surgery (EACTS), becoming the association's first president. He established the organization after becoming frustrated with other scientific meetings for cardiac surgeons in Europe, where he found that a speaker's nationality carried more weight than his or her scientific work. He said that forming EACTS was his proudest achievement.

In 2006, he received the "Grand Prix scientifique" of the Lefoulon-Delalande Foundation.

Fontan died on 14 January 2018.
