= Kawashima procedure =

- Specialty: Cardiology

The Kawashima procedure is used for congenital heart disease with a single effective ventricle and an interrupted inferior vena cava (IVC). It was first performed in 1978 and reported in 1984.

== Procedure ==
Technically it is very similar to the bidirectional Glenn procedure used to direct half the body's venous blood flow into the lungs. However, in patients with interrupted IVC, most of the blood from the lower body actually joins the blood from the upper body before returning to the heart via the superior vena cava (SVC). Therefore, the redirection of SVC blood to the lungs (as in the Glenn) results in much more than half the venous blood flow being diverted.

After Kawashima, the only de-oxygenated blood returning to the heart is from the abdominal organs (via the hepatic veins). As a result, there is much less hypoxia than after Glenn, and the heart is pumping less additional blood than after Glenn. However, the hypoxia can worsen over time (because of the development of microscopic AVMs in the lungs that allow blood to pass through without being oxygenated), and therefore these children still may need a complete Fontan procedure in the end.
