= Damus–Kaye–Stansel procedure =

- Specialty: Cardiology

The Damus–Kaye–Stansel (DKS) procedure is a cardiovascular surgical procedure used as part of the repair of some congenital heart defects. This procedure joins the pulmonary artery and the aorta in situations where the systemic circulation is obstructed. It is commonly used when a patient has the combination of a small left ventricle and a transposition of the great arteries (TGA); in this case, the procedure allows blood to flow from the left ventricle to the aorta.

== History ==
The DKS procedure is named for three physicians – Paul Damus, Michael Peter Kaye, and H. C. Stansel – who independently reported the procedure in the literature in the 1970s. At that time, the procedure was used for patients who had TGA with a ventricular septal defect (VSD). By the late 2000s, the procedure was employed in situations where the right ventricle is bigger than the left ventricle and the left ventricle connects to the pulmonary artery instead of the aorta; examples include double inlet left ventricle, TGA with tricuspid atresia and TGA with hypoplastic left heart syndrome.

== The procedure ==
In the original DKS procedure, surgeons separated the main pulmonary artery (MPA) just below the point where it divides into the right and left pulmonary arteries. The end of the MPA was then joined to the side of the ascending aorta, allowing blood from the left heart to communicate directly with the aorta. The procedure was later accomplished via a "double-barrel" technique that resulted in a new aorta with two valves. Later, a modified DKS was reported in which an aortic flap technique was utilized.

== See also ==
- Cardiac surgery
