= Hypoplasia =

Underdevelopment of a tissue or organ

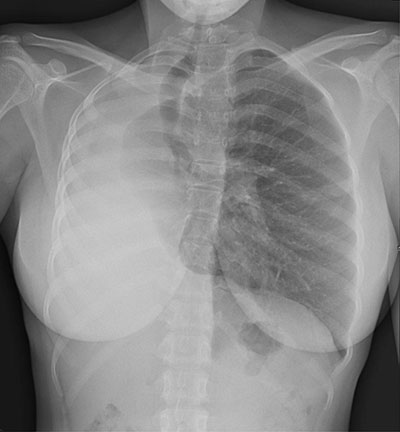
Pulmonary hypoplasia

Hypoplasia (from Ancient Greek ὑπo- (hypo-) 'under' and πλάσις (plasis) 'formation'; adjective form hypoplastic) is underdevelopment or incomplete development of a tissue or organ. Although the term is not always used precisely, it properly refers to an inadequate or below-normal number of cells. Hypoplasia is similar to aplasia, but less severe. It is technically not the opposite of hyperplasia (too many cells). Hypoplasia is a congenital condition, while hyperplasia generally refers to excessive cell growth later in life. (Atrophy, the wasting away of already existing cells, is technically the direct opposite of both hyperplasia and hypertrophy.)

Hypoplasia can be present in any tissue or organ. It is descriptive of many medical conditions, including underdevelopment of organs such as:

- Breasts during puberty
- Testes in Klinefelter's syndrome
- Ovaries in Fanconi anemia, gonadal dysgenesis, trisomy X
- Thymus in DiGeorge syndrome
- Labia majora in popliteal pterygium syndrome
- Corpus callosum, connecting the two sides of the brain, in agenesis of the corpus callosum
- Cerebellum caused by mutation in the reelin gene
- Tooth caused by oral pathology, such as Turner's hypoplasia
- Chambers of the heart in hypoplastic left heart syndrome and hypoplastic right heart syndrome
- Optic nerve in optic nerve hypoplasia
- Sacrum in sacral agenesis
- Facial muscle in asymmetric crying facies
- Thumb from birth
- Lungs, often as a result of oligohydramnios during gestation or the existence of congenital diaphragmatic hernia
- Small bowel in coeliac disease
- Fingers and ears in harlequin-type ichthyosis
- Mandible in congenital hypothyroidism

== See also ==
- Atrophy, when an existing part wastes away
- List of biological development disorders
