= Double inlet left ventricle =

- Other names: Single ventricle
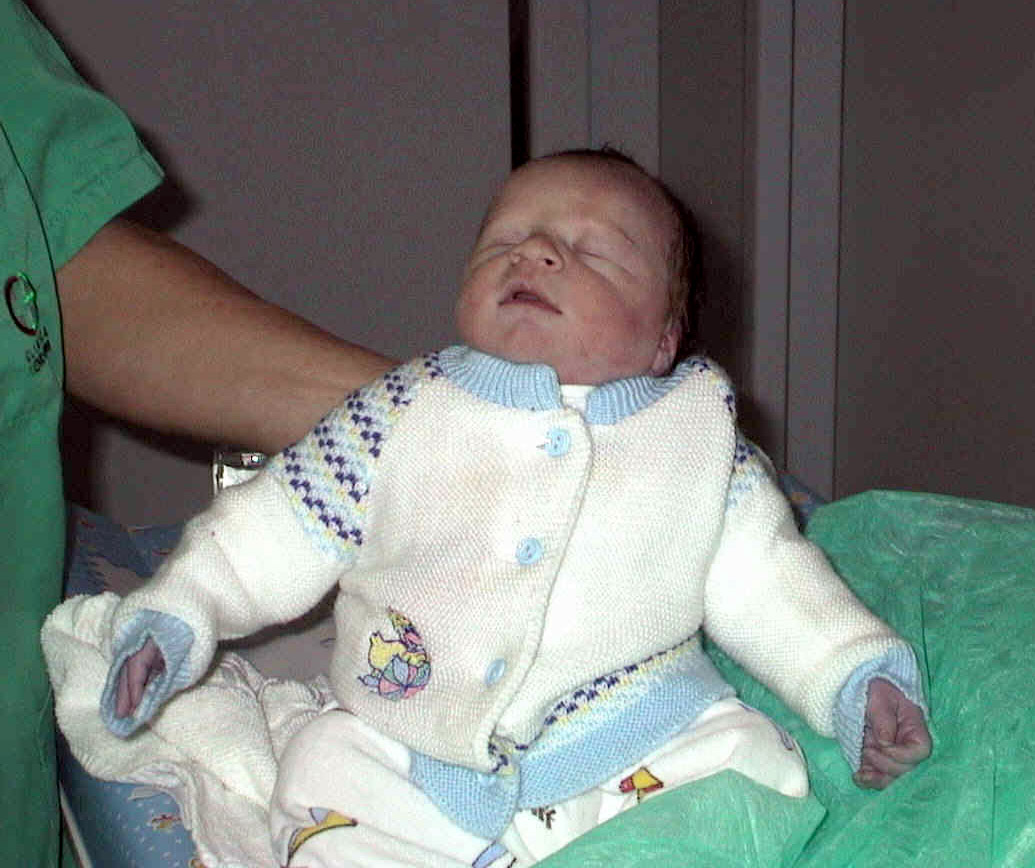
- Cyanotic neonate

A double inlet left ventricle (DILV) or single ventricle is a congenital heart defect appearing in 5 in 100,000 newborns, where both the left atrium and the right atrium feed into the left ventricle. The right ventricle is hypoplastic or does not exist.

Both atria communicate with the ventricle by a single atrio-ventricular valve. There is a big shunt left-right with a quickly evolutive pulmonary hypertension. Without life-prolonging interventions, the condition is fatal, but with intervention, the newborn may survive. Even if there is no foetal sickness, the diagnosis can be made in utero by foetal echocardiography.

== Presentation ==
Infants born with DILV cannot feed normally (breathlessness) and have difficulty gaining weight. The mixed blood in systemic circulation leads to hypoxia (lack of oxygen to the body and organs), so infants develop cyanosis and breathlessness early.

== Treatment ==
- In the first few days, if there is no pulmonary valve stenosis, a pulmonary valve banding is necessary to prevent pulmonary hypertension and the ductus must be kept open to allow blood-flow using medication containing prostaglandin. At same time, if necessary, the atrial and ventricular septum communications must be enlarged.
- When possible Glenn procedure is done.
- Later, surgical options include the Damus–Kaye–Stansel procedure, the Fontan procedure, and the Norwood procedure. The goal of all of these is separating the pulmonary and the systemic circulation.

Usually, DILV is associated with other cardiac malformations.

== Prognosis ==
Mortality is very high in the first 2 years, 85%, but after it decreases and between 2 and 15 years old the mortality is only around 9%. Diagnosis must be made within few days or even hours to prevent death.
