= Sano shunt =

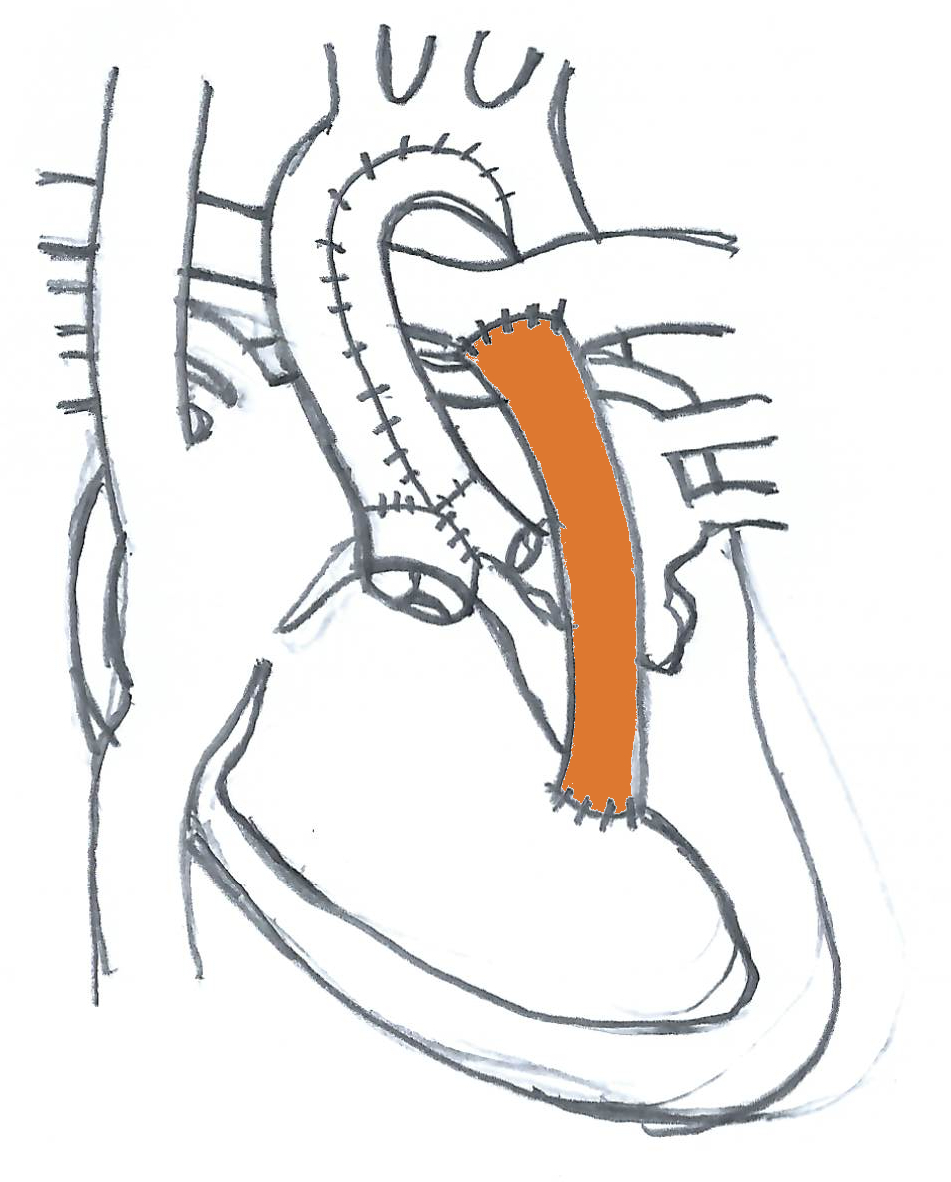
- Diagram of Sano shunt (orange) in hypoplastic left heart syndrome after Norwood Procedure

A Sano shunt is a shunt from the right ventricle to the pulmonary circulation.

In contrast to a Blalock-Thomas-Taussig shunt, circulation is primarily in systole.

It is sometimes used as the first step in a Norwood procedure.

This procedure was pioneered by the Japanese cardiothoracic surgeon Shunji Sano in 2003.
