= Plastic bronchitis =

- Other names: Fibrinous bronchitis, bronchitis pseudomembranosa, Hoffmann bronchitis
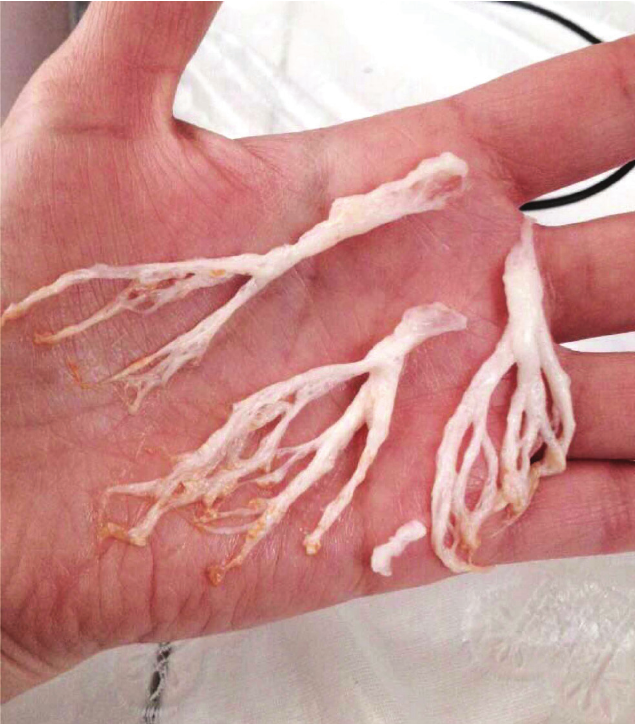
- Bronchial casts
- Specialty: Respirology

Plastic bronchitis (PB) is a disorder in which branching casts of the airways – i.e., accumulations of fluid or tissue that are molded in the shape of the airway – are expectorated. PB is not a single disease with a defined mechanism that explains the cast formation in all conditions. Examples of diseases associated with expectoration of casts, and which sometimes are labeled PB, include tuberculosis, atypical mycobacterial disease, allergic bronchopulmonary aspergillosis, and asthma.

When casts are very large with many branches, an abnormal communication or leakage of lymphatic fluid into the airway is often the cause. This entity is termed lymphatic plastic bronchitis (LPB). LPB is a lymphatic flow disorder characterized by the recurrent formation of branching, rubbery bronchial casts composed primarily of proteinaceous and sometimes chylous material and lymphocytes. Lymphatic fluids deposited into the airspaces become gelatinous as they cool, forming large string cheese-like casts of the airways, which can obstruct airflow. Attempts to expectorate casts can be quite frightening, leading to fears of asphyxiation.

== Signs and symptoms ==
The clinical presentation of plastic bronchitis beyond expectoration of casts includes a productive cough, dyspnea, fever and wheezing. Focal wheezing is a characteristic, if not specific, physical examination finding. If the casts completely obstruct the airway, breath sounds will be decreased and dullness will be present with percussion. With partial obstruction, a "fan sound" or "flag flapping" sound can be heard during auscultation. Bronchial casts can sometimes fill the airways of almost an entire lung, and present as an acute, life-threatening emergency.

== Pathology ==
The majority of PB cases are associated with an underlying disease. Several systemic illnesses have been associated with plastic bronchitis:

- Cardiac: constrictive pericarditis, congenital heart disease
- Pulmonary: asthma, allergic bronchopulmonary aspergillosis, aspergillosis, bronchiectasis, cystic fibrosis, tuberculosis, pneumonia, and bronchocentric granulomatosis
- Disorders of lymphatic drainage: lymphangiectasia, lymphangiomatosis
- Miscellaneous: acute chest syndrome/sickle cell disease, amyloidosis, rheumatoid arthritis, pseudomembranous colitis, inhaled irritants, neoplastic (lymphoma)

The most common form of plastic bronchitis follows cardiac surgery for congenital heart disease, especially the Fontan procedure. Systemic blood flow is diverted to pulmonary flow, elevating pressures in the pulmonary venous system, and promoting leaks of proteinaceous and lipid-rich fluids from the lymphatics into the bronchial tree.

== Diagnosis ==
Plastic bronchitis cast

The diagnosis of plastic bronchitis is confirmed by recovery of casts that have been coughed up or visualized during a bronchoscopy. There is no specific cytologic, pathologic or laboratory test that is diagnostic for casts due to lymphatic PB.

=== Imaging ===
Simple chest X-rays may reveal collapse due to airway obstruction. The contralateral lung may be hyperinflated. Casts can be visualized within the major airways using computerized axial tomography scans.

Heavy T2-weighted MRI, and, as appropriate, intranodal lymphangiogram and/or dynamic contrast-enhanced MR lymphangiography may be useful for identifying pathological lymphatic tissue or lymphatic flow.

== Management ==
Acute therapy for PB is often focused on removal or facilitated expectoration of the casts. This is followed by short- and long-term efforts to identify and remediate the underlying condition resulting in the excessive airway leakage or inflammation that is causing the casts to form.

PB can present as a life threatening emergency when the casts obstruct the major airways, resulting in acute respiratory distress. Intervention by a skilled physician experienced with foreign body removal from the lungs is essential. Evaluation by means of bronchoscopy can be difficult and time consuming and is best performed under general anesthesia.

Casts can be removed mechanically by bronchoscopy or physical therapy. High-frequency chest wall oscillation can also be used to vibrate the chest wall at a high frequency to try to loosen and thin the casts. Inhaled therapy using bronchodilators, corticosteroids or mucolytics can be used to try to disrupt the cast formation. Guaifenesin syrup or tablets can assist in loosening existing casts for expectoration.

Recently, heavy T2-weighted MRI has revealed that occult lymphatic anomalies that represent developmental remnants or subclinical GLA are present in adults who present with expectoration of large multiantennary, branching casts. Intranodal lymphangiogram and dynamic contrast-enhanced MR lymphangiography have been used to more precisely image the leaks, and in the small number of patients who have been treated to date, embolization of the thoracic duct has been highly successful in controlling cast formation.

Cannulation of the thoracic duct followed by embolization should be considered in those patients who are shown to have leakage of lymphatic fluid into the airway.

=== Medications ===
Therapeutic interventions with medium-chain triglyceride-enriched low-fat diets, intratracheal heparin, inhaled tissue plasminogen activator, and steroids have also been reported and have met with variable success.

Expectorants such as guaifenesin increase thinner secretions and lubricate the airways, allowing loosening and possible self-expulsion of casts.

Inhaled mucolytics: Potassium iodide and acetylcysteine inhaled therapy are often used to help the patient cough up the casts by breaking down the thick mucus formations.

Inhaled and oral steroids: If PB is associated with asthma or an infection, inhaled and oral steroids have been shown to be effective.

== Prognosis ==
Patients with plastic bronchitis that is being caused due to a co-morbid condition generally have a good prognosis once the underlying disease is treated.

== Epidemiology ==
To date, about 420 cases have been reported in the medical literature. Given its unusual nature, the true prevalence of PB is unknown, and it is likely that many patients are undiagnosed. PB does affect patients of all age groups and genders.

== See also ==
- Eosinophilic plastic bronchitis
