= William Glenn =

American cardiac surgeon

William Wallace Lumpkin Glenn (August 12, 1914 – March 10, 2003) was an American cardiac surgeon who co-created an early version of an artificial heart and was the developer of a technique for the treatment of congenital heart defects.

Glenn was born on August 12, 1914, in Asheville, North Carolina. His father was a medical doctor and his mother an attorney. He was sent to attend the Sewanee Military Academy in Sewanee, Tennessee. He attended the University of South Carolina, graduating in 1934 with a Bachelor of Science degree. He attended Philadelphia's Jefferson Medical College, graduating with his medical degree in 1938. His internship was performed at Pennsylvania Hospital, while he performed his residency in surgery at Massachusetts General Hospital. During World War II, Glenn served as a field surgeon in the Army Medical Corps, serving in Europe where he established a field hospital in Normandy.

He was hired in October 1948 by Dr. Gustaf Lindskog, Chairman of the Department of Surgery, and was assigned to supervise the Surgical Laboratories and the Section of Cardiac Surgery (Cardiovascular). He was given the assignment of serving as thesis advisor to William Sewell, a student at Yale School of Medicine who was working on a required research project in which he was attempting to develop a heart pump. The original pump that was developed used components costing a total $24.80, which included a number of standard laboratory supplies, some assorted hardware and an Erector Set. Glenn and Sewell presented the results of their experiments at the 1949 annual congress of the American College of Surgeons in Chicago. The model they presented took over the functions of the heart's right side, taking deoxygenated blood to the lungs. They reported that they had kept animals alive for up to 90 minutes using their device, without significant changes in blood pressure or oxygen saturation. The device created using the Erector Set is on display at the Smithsonian Institution's National Museum of American History. The Smithsonian acquired the heart pump in 1959 from Sewell's mother.

Glenn served as Yale's chief of cardiovascular surgery until 1975. There, he developed improvements to cardiac pacemakers, and created the "Glenn shunt" (or "Glenn Operation") in 1954, a vena cava-pulmonary artery shunt that bypasses the defective right chambers of the heart of "Blue Babies", augmenting the inadequate blood flow to the lungs and thus providing oxygen that, when missing, gives the babies their blue color. He was the author of Glenn's Thoracic and Cardiovascular Surgery, a standard textbook for the practice of vascular surgery that was in its sixth edition by the time of his death. From 1979 until 1981, he served as president of the American Heart Association, the first surgeon to be selected for the position.

Glenn died at age 88 on March 10, 2003 in Peterborough, New Hampshire at Monadnock Community Hospital. He was survived by his wife Amory, as well as a son, a daughter and five grandchildren.
