= The Journal of Heart and Lung Transplantation =

- Discipline: Transplantation
- Language: English
- Edited by: Daniel R. Goldstein, MD

Publication details
- Former name(s): Heart Transplantation, Journal of Heart Transplantation
- History: 1981–present
- Publisher: Elsevier
- Frequency: Monthly
- Impact factor: 8.9 (2022)

Standard abbreviations
- ISO 4: J. Heart Lung Transplant.

Indexing
- CODEN: JHLTES
- ISSN: 1053-2498 (print); 1557-3117 (web)
- LCCN: 91640696
- OCLC no.: 22486861

Links
- Journal homepage; Online access; Online archive

The Journal of Heart and Lung Transplantation is a monthly peer-reviewed medical journal covering heart and lung transplantation. It was established in 1981 as Heart Transplantation, and was renamed to the Journal of Heart Transplantation in 1984. It obtained its current name in 1991. It is published by Elsevier on behalf of the International Society for Heart and Lung Transplantation, of which is the official journal. The editor-in-chief is Mandeep R. Mehra (Harvard Medical School). According to the Journal Citation Reports, the journal has a 2021 impact factor of 13.569, the highest of any journal in cardiothoracic surgery.
