= Fontan procedure =

Surgical procedure used in children with univentricular hearts

- Fontan procedure for tricuspid atresia
- Uses: Palliative surgery for child with univentricular heart

The Fontan procedure or Fontan–Kreutzer procedure is a palliative surgical procedure used in children with univentricular hearts. It involves diverting the venous blood from the inferior vena cava (IVC) and superior vena cava (SVC) to the pulmonary arteries. The procedure varies for differing congenital heart pathologies. For example, in tricuspid atresia, the procedure can be done where the blood does not pass through the morphologic right ventricle; i.e., the systemic and pulmonary circulations are placed in series with the functional single ventricle. By contrast, in hypoplastic left heart syndrome, the heart is more reliant on the more functional right ventricle to provide blood flow to the systemic circulation. The procedure was initially performed in 1968 by Francis Fontan and Eugene Baudet from Bordeaux, France, published in 1971, simultaneously described in July 1971 by Guillermo Kreutzer from Buenos Aires, Argentina, presented at the Argentinean National Cardiology meeting of that year and finally published in 1973.

== Indications ==
The Fontan Kreutzer procedure is used in pediatric patients who possess only a single functional ventricle, either due to lack of a heart valve (e.g. tricuspid or mitral atresia), an abnormality of the pumping ability of the heart (e.g. hypoplastic left heart syndrome or hypoplastic right heart syndrome), or a complex congenital heart disease where a bi-ventricular repair is impossible or inadvisable. The surgery allows blood to be delivered to the lungs via central venous pressure rather than via the right ventricle. Patients typically present as neonates with cyanosis or congestive heart failure. Fontan completion is usually carried out when the patient is 2–5 years of age, but is also performed before 2 years of age.

== Types ==
There are four variations of the Fontan procedure:

- Ventricularization of the Right Atrium (The original Fontan's Technique)
- Atriopulmonary connection (the original Kreutzer's Technique)
- Intracardiac total cavopulmonary connection (lateral tunnel) (described by Marc De Leval and Aldo Castañeda, separately)
- Extracardiac total cavopulmonary connection (described by Carlo Marceletti and Francisco Puga for Heterotaxy Syndrome)

== Approach ==
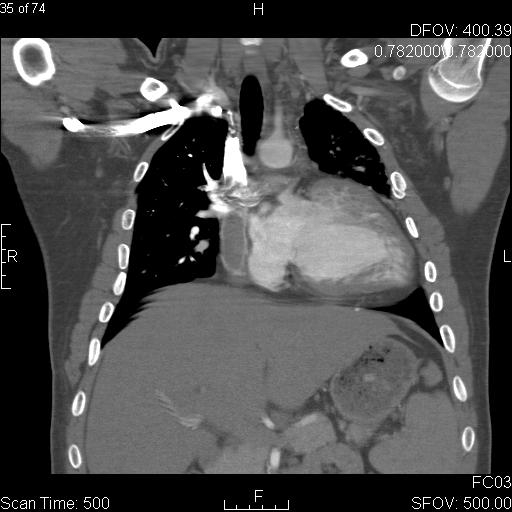
Coronal CT image in a 19-year-old patient with tricuspid atresia treated with bidirectional Glenn shunt and Fontan.

The Fontan-Kreutzer procedure is the third procedure in the staged surgical palliation. It is performed in children born with congenital heart disease without two functional ventricles and an effective parallel blood flow circuit.

The first stage is known as the Norwood procedure. This stage generally involves combining the pulmonary artery and aorta to form a larger vessel for blood to get to the body. An artificial tube or shunt can be placed from this larger vessel to the pulmonary arteries so that blood can get from the heart to the lungs. The wall between the left and right atrium can be removed to allow the mixing of oxygenated and de-oxygenated blood.

The second stage is called the hemi-Fontan or the Bidirectional Glenn procedure. This intermediary stage incorporates the shifting of oxygen-poor blood from the top of the body to the lungs. The superior vena cava (SVC), which carries blood returning from the upper parts of the body, is disconnected from the heart and instead redirects the blood into the pulmonary arteries. The inferior vena cava (IVC), which carries blood returning from the lower body, continues to connect to the right atrium.

The third stage is called the Fontan-Kreutzer procedure which involves redirecting the blood from the inferior vena cava to the lungs. At this point, the oxygen-poor blood from upper and lower body flows through the lungs without being pumped (driven only by the pressure that builds up in the veins or central venous pressure). This improves the lower than normal oxygen levels and results in one functional ventricle that is responsible for supplying blood to the rest of the body. There are currently three various modern techniques for the Fontan procedure which include: Atriopulmonary connection, lateral tunnel total cavopulmonary connection, and extracardiac conduit.

== Contraindications ==
After Fontan Kreutzer completion, blood must flow through the lungs without being pumped by the heart. Therefore, children with high pulmonary vascular resistance may not tolerate a Fontan procedure. Often, cardiac catheterization is performed to check the resistance before proceeding with the surgery. This is also the reason a Fontan procedure cannot be done immediately after birth; the pulmonary vascular resistance is high in utero and takes months to drop. Fontan procedure is also contraindicated in those with pulmonary artery hypoplasia and significant mitral insufficiency.

== Post-operative complications ==
In the short term, children can have trouble with pleural effusions (fluid building up around the lungs). This can require a longer stay in the hospital for drainage with chest tubes. To address this risk, some surgeons make a fenestration from the venous circulation into the atrium. When the pressure in the veins is high, some of the oxygen-poor blood can escape through the fenestration to relieve the pressure. However, this results in hypoxia, so the fenestration may eventually need to be closed by an interventional cardiologist.

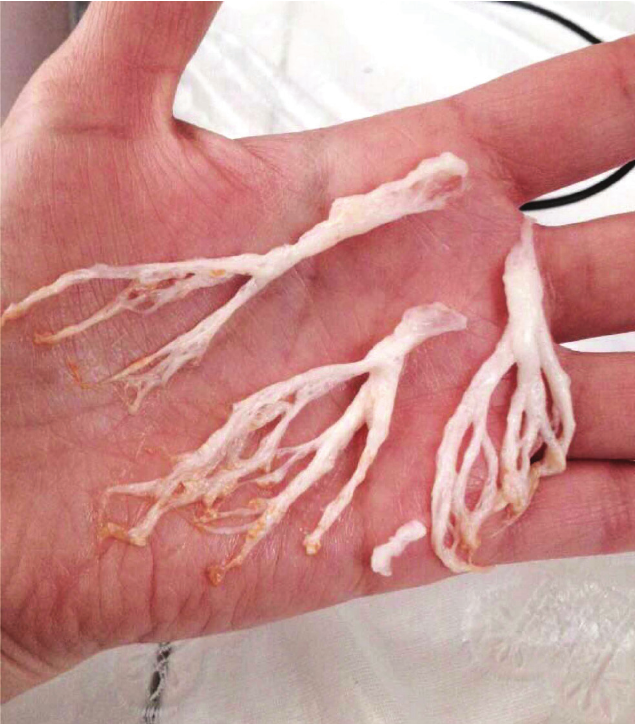
Plastic bronchitis

In a 2016 review, Dr. Jack Rychik, head of the Single Ventricle Survivorship Program at Children's Hospital of Philadelphia summarized the long-term consequences of Fontan circulation as an "indolent and progressive state of heart failure" with predictable long-term consequences on several organ systems. Chronic venous hypertension from the stasis and lowered cardiac output are assumed to be at the root of lymphatic complications such as chylothorax, protein losing enteropathy and plastic bronchitis. These complications may occur in the immediate post-operative period as well as in the medium and long term. New interventional and surgical strategies have been investigated to relieve the lymphatic complications associated with the Fontan circulation. Concerns about damage to the liver have emerged more recently, as the Fontan circulation produces congestion and lymphedema in this organ. This can lead towards progressive hepatic fibrosis and other complications of Fontan-associated liver disease. Screening protocols and treatment standards are emerging in the light of these discoveries.

Because of structural and electrochemical changes related to scarring after the procedure, arrhythmias are common. Pacemakers are placed in as many as 7% of patients who undergo the Fontan procedure. While the need for pacemakers may be related to the underlying cardiac anomaly, there is sufficient evidence that the surgery itself lead to the need for cardiac pacing.

The Fontan procedure is palliative — not curative — but more than 80% of the cases can result in normal or near-normal growth, development, exercise tolerance, and good quality of life. However, 10% or more of patients may eventually require heart transplantation, and given the long-term consequences of chronic venous hypertension and insidious organ damage, freedom from morbidity is unlikely in the long term. New approaches to the management of failing Fontans or other clinical deterioration have included lymphatic decompression surgical procedures & intervention, Ventricular assist devices or other mechanical support therapies as either bridge to transplantation or destination therapies.

Renal complications may occur. This is attributed to the circulatory changes in blood flow as well as possible exposure to nephrotoxic medications, iodine contrast agents, and long term cyanotic and ischemic nephropathy. Abnormalities including chronic kidney disease and impaired renal function have been shown with measured renal function. Popular markers, such as proteinuria and microalbuminuria, are used in the measurement renal function.

It is estimated in 2018 there was an 85% for a survival rate of thirty years following a Fontan procedure and there are approximately 50,000 to 70,000 people in the world with Fontan circulation. It is approximated that 40% of people with Fontan circulation are ≥18 years of age.

== Fontan circulation ==
A normal heart system has a series circuit with the right ventricle pumping blood into the pulmonary circulation. After exchanging gases, the blood is delivered to the left ventricle (and systemic arteries) through the pulmonary veins. In Fontan circulation, the right ventricle does not exist (or is bypassed), and the venae cavae are attached directly to the pulmonary artery. After oxygenation, the blood is pumped into the aorta by the unique, single ventricle. Because of the missing right ventricle, the force driving blood through the lungs is strongly reduced. This causes engorgement of the venous circulation, the most frequent complication of the Fontan procedure.

== Pregnancy considerations ==
Fontan circulation can influence the peripartum or pregnant physiologic states. Pregnancy has historically been discouraged in Fontan patients due to high rates of miscarriage, cardiovascular compromise, or increased mortality. Many complications have been attributed to flawed placental function. However, improvements of the Fontan operation have resulted in pregnancies with lower incidence of heart and vascular compromise in the mother. Complications that may occur in the fetus may include, but are not limited to: oligohydramnios, preterm birth, low birth weight, small size for gestational age, or still birth. Maternal complications can include, but are not limited to: heart failure, thromboembolism, arrhythmias, and preeclampsia.

== History ==
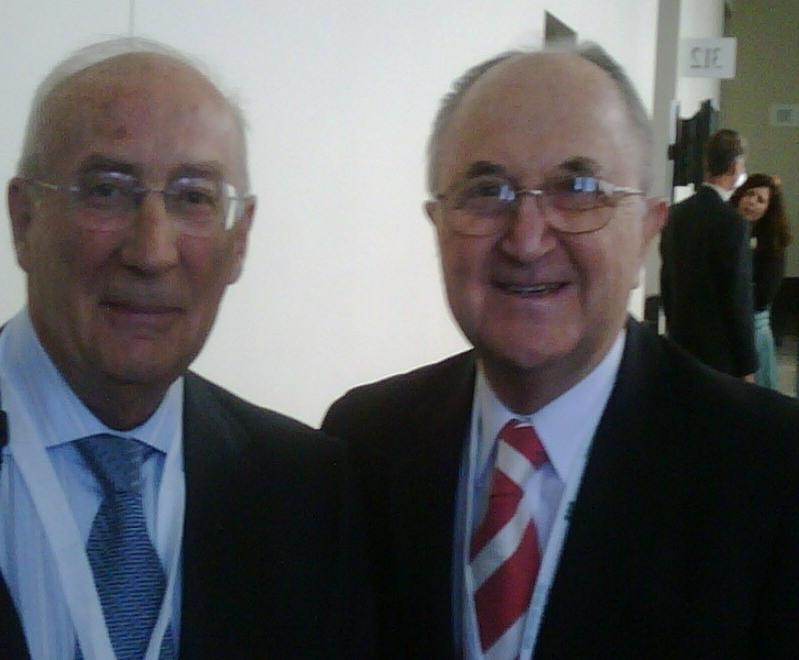
Francis Fontan (left) and Guillermo Kreutzer (right) in 2009

The Fontan procedure was initially described in 1971 by Dr. Francis Fontan (1929–2018) from Bordeaux, France. Prior to this, the surgical treatment for tricuspid atresia consisted of creating a shunt between a systemic artery and the pulmonary artery (Blalock-Taussig shunt) or the superior vena cava and the pulmonary artery (Glenn shunt). These procedures were associated with high mortality rates, commonly leading to death before the age of one year. In an attempt to improve this, Fontan was engaged in research between 1964 and 1966 endeavouring to fully redirect flow from the superior and inferior vena cavae to the pulmonary artery. His initial attempts in dogs were unsuccessful and all experimental animals died within a few hours; however, despite these failures, he successfully performed this operation in a young woman with tricuspid atresia in 1968 with Dr. Eugene Baudet. The operation was completed on a second patient in 1970, and after a third case the series was published in the international journal Thorax in 1971. Dr. Guillermo Kreutzer from Buenos Aires, Argentina (b. 1934), without any knowledge of Fontan's experience, performed a similar procedure in July, 1971 without placing a valve in the Inferior Vena Cava inlet and introduced the concept of "fenestration" – leaving a small atrial septal defect to serve as a pop-off valve for the circulation. Techniques have been improved to include the lateral tunnel and use of an extracardiac conduit for congenital heart diseases beyond tricuspid atresia (hypoplastic left heart syndrome, etc).
