= Glenn procedure =

- Specialty: Cardiology

Glenn procedure is a palliative surgical procedure performed for patients with tricuspid atresia. It is also part of the surgical treatment path for hypoplastic left heart syndrome and hypoplastic right heart syndrome. This procedure has been largely replaced by Bidirectional Glenn procedure.

It connects the superior vena cava to the right pulmonary artery.
