= Norwood procedure =

Surgery performed on the heart

- Diagram of a healthy heart and one with Hypoplastic left heart syndrome. In the heart on the right, note the near absence of the left ventricle, which normally provides systemic circulation. Following the three-stage palliation (Norwood, Glenn or hemi-Fontan, then Fontan), blood flow from the right ventricle is rerouted to serve this function, which means that an alternative source of pulmonary circulation must be provided.
- ICD-9-CM: 35.8

The Norwood procedure is the first of three palliative surgeries for patients with hypoplastic left heart syndrome (HLHS) and other complex heart defects with single ventricle physiology intended to create a new functional single ventricle system. The first successful Norwood procedure involving the use of a cardiopulmonary bypass was reported by Dr. William Imon Norwood, Jr. and colleagues in 1981.

Variations of the Norwood procedure, or Stage 1 palliation, have been proposed and adopted over the last 30 years; however, its basic components have remained unchanged. The purpose of the procedure is to utilize the right ventricle as the main chamber pumping blood to the body and lungs. A connection between left and right atria (collecting chambers of the heart) is established via atrial septectomy, allowing blood arriving from the lungs to travel to the right ventricle. Next a connection between the right ventricle and aorta is created using a tissue graft from the main pulmonary artery. Lastly, an aortopulmonary shunt is created to provide blood flow to the lungs from the systemic circulation. The most common shunts are the Modified Blalock Taussig shunt (MBTS) or right ventricle- to pulmonary artery shunt (RVPA or Sano shunt).

Most patients who undergo a Norwood procedure will proceed to further stages of single ventricle palliation. A second surgery, also known as the Glenn procedure, occurs at 4–6 months of age. The third surgery is the Fontan procedure, occurring when patients are 3–5 years of age.

== Indications ==
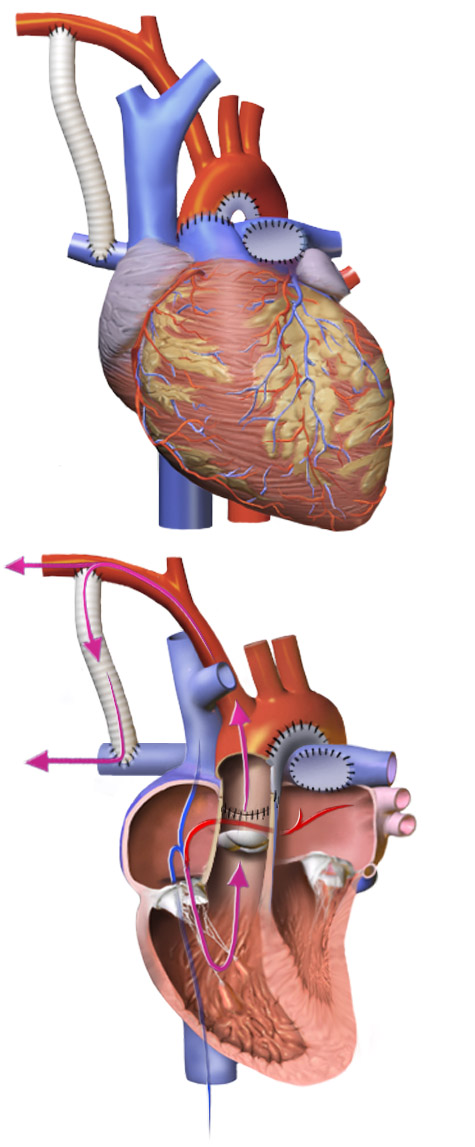
Norwood procedure

Norwood procedure is most commonly performed to treat hypoplastic left heart syndrome, double outlet right ventricle, double inlet left ventricle, and other single ventricle congenital heart defects. Variations are also used for palliation of mitral and tricuspid atresia and subsets of transposition of great arteries (TGA).

Without surgical repair, infants born with a single ventricle cardiac defect face almost certain mortality in the first year of life. In these conditions, the most urgent problem is that the heart is unable to pump blood to the systemic circulation (i.e. to the body). The goal of these three surgeries is to ultimately connect the single ventricle to the systemic circulation. To accomplish this, blood flow to the lungs is disrupted, and therefore an alternative path must be created to provide blood flow to the lungs.

=== Contraindications ===
There are numerous factors that increase the risk of the Norwood procedure and are relative contraindications. Those factors include Low birth weight, extremely premature delivery, poor ventricular function, Intraventricular hemorrhage, severe non-cardiac congenital defects, and genetic syndromes with poor prognosis.

=== Alternate Options ===
While the Norwood procedure is the standard of care for single ventricle cardiac defects, there are other treatment options for patients depending on their unique anatomy. One option is the Hybrid procedure which is done via cardiac catheterization and surgery. A stent is placed in the ductus arteriosus to keep it patent and bands are placed over both the left and right pulmonary arteries to limit pressure and over-circulation to the lungs. Another option is cardiac transplantation, although this is uncommon due to the limited availability of neonatal donor hearts. Families can also elect to pursue comfort care for their newborns, especially if there are concomitant anatomic defects or genetic syndromes with poor prognosis.

== Process ==
Entry to the body cavity for the Norwood procedure is gained by a vertical incision above the sternum. Separation of the sternum is necessary. This surgery is complex and may vary slightly depending on the diagnosis and overall condition of the heart. The surgery on the heart can be divided into two main steps.

=== Providing systemic circulation ===
The main pulmonary artery is separated from the left and right portions of the pulmonary artery and joined with the upper portion of the aorta. Widening of the pulmonary artery is often necessary, and may be accomplished by using the patient's existing biological tissue, or appropriate animal tissue. This allows the blood, a mixture of oxygenated and deoxygenated, to be pumped to the body via the morphologic right ventricle, through the pulmonary valve. At this point in the surgery, the right ventricle is directly connected to systemic circulation through the Neoaorta or the reconstructed aortic outflow track. Second step of the procedure establishes blood flow to the lungs.

=== Providing pulmonary circulation ===
Variations to this step have been proposed over the years, however only two have been adapted in general practice over the last 20 years. In both cases a conduit is used to direct blood flow into the lungs, however anatomic anchoring varies. There are two different types of shunts used during the procedure: Modified Blalock Taussig or (MBTS) and right ventricle- to pulmonary artery shunt (RVPA or Sano shunt). MBTS shunt provides connection from the pulmonary artery to brachiocephalic artery or subclavian artery, while the RVPA conduit provides connection from right ventricle to pulmonary artery.

- Blalock-Taussig Shunt, a Gore-Tex conduit (a kind of plastic tubing) is used to connect the subclavian artery to the pulmonary artery. In this case blood comes from the single ventricle, through the pulmonary valve, the reconstructed aorta, the subclavian artery, and the conduit, to the lungs. There are variations on this procedure where the origin of the shunt is elsewhere in the systemic circulation (e.g. from the aorta itself) rather than the subclavian artery.
- With a Sano shunt, an incision is made in the wall of the single ventricle, and a Gore-Tex conduit is used to connect the ventricle to the pulmonary artery. Direct canalization to the right ventricle provides pulsatile blood flow compared to the Blalock-Taussig conduit.

The Single Ventricle Reconstruction trial conducted in 2005 compared the two conduits at one, three and five year intervals. Although RVPA shunts performed better at the one and three year end points, five year follow up demonstrated no difference between survival or improvement in freedom from transplantation.

After Norwood procedure infants enter the interstage which typically lasts up to 5 months. During this period the patients are medically optimized using diuretics and vasodilators.

== Outcomes ==
The Norwood procedure is a complex and high-risk surgery with high rates of morbidity and mortality despite advancements in surgical technique, perioperative care, and postoperative monitoring.

=== Surgical Complications ===
Immediate post surgical complications have been reported by multiple studies to involve hemorrhage, vocal cord paralysis due to close proximity of the recurrent laryngeal nerve to the cardiac sack, cardiac arrhythmias as a result of potential cardiac tissue manipulation and damage, and protein-losing enteropathy. Other surgical complications include low cardiac output syndrome, atrioventricular valve regurgitation, aortic valve insufficiency, ventricular dysfunction, seizures, stroke, shunt thrombosis, infection, cardiac arrest, and death.

=== Interstage Period ===
The interstage period is the period after the Norwood procedure and before stage II pallation (Glenn procedure, typically 4–6 months of age). This time is very high-risk for infants because the single ventricle must pump to both the systemic and pulmonary circulations, with mortality rates ranging from 2%-20%.

Due to the balance required to maintain adequate blood flow to the systemic and pulmonary circulations, infants in the interstage period face multiple risks:

- Low Oxygen Saturation: Oxygen saturation remains low during the interstage period because there is mixing between the systemic and pulmonic circulations.
- Poor Weight Gain: Many infants experience difficulty with feeding and growth. Due to the increased energy demands of a single-ventricle heart, they often require higher caloric intake. Slow weight gain can impact readiness for the Glenn procedure.
- Heart Failure: The single ventricle must support both systemic and pulmonary circulation, which can lead to heart failure if demands exceed functional capacity.
- Arrhythmias: Abnormal heart rhythms can occur due to the congenital defect or secondary to manipulation of cardiac tissue during surgery.
- Shunt Obstruction: The shunt (mBTTs or Sano) placed during the Norwood procedure that re-establishes pulmonary circulation can become narrowed or obstructed, necessitating urgent intervention.

=== Long-Term Outcomes ===
Long-term survival rates for children with single ventricle physiology are improving as medical and surgical advancements continue. In the major SVR trial (Single Ventricle Reconstruction) the transplant-free survival rate was only 54-59% amongst patients who underwent the Norwood procedure. These patients experience ongoing health challenges and require lifelong cardiology follow-up.

==== Neurodevelopment ====
Children with single-ventricle physiology who undergo the Norwood procedure often experience neurodevelopmental impairment. Neurodevelopmental and behavioral impairments are the most common long-term morbidity for children with single ventricle cardiac defects. Children's hospitals have begun to implement multidisciplinary neurodevelopmental care teams as part of the standard of care for this population. The impact of these interventional programs remains an active area of research.

Factors affecting neurodevelopment in these children include:

- Fetal brain dysmaturation
- Intraoperative hypoxia
- Use of cardiopulmonary bypass
- Strokes
- Seizures
- Arrhythmias
- Heart failure
- Extended hospitalizations

Children who undergo the Norwood procedure may experience a range of neurodevelopmental issues, such as:

- Cognitive Delays
- Motor Delays
- Behavioral and Social Challenges
- Learning Disabilities
- Psychological Concerns

== History ==
First ever series of documented Norwood procedures were performed by Dr. William Imon Norwood between 1979 and 1981. Dr. Norwood was an American physician who completed his fellowship in cardiothoracic pediatric surgery at Boston Children's Medical Center (BCMC), Boston Massachusetts. During his time at BCMC he became interested in the most complex congenital heart defects, particularly HLHS. Under direct supervision of his program mentor Dr. Aldo Castañeda, he performed and later perfected what would become the three stage Norwood palliation. After successful publication of his work in 1981, Dr. Norwood joined the Project Hope stationed in Krakow, Poland. There, he continued to develop and refine his work: he was responsible for Poland's first ever Fontan procedure in a patient with single ventricle pathology.
