= Thorax (journal) =

- Discipline: Pulmonology
- Language: English
- Edited by: Professor Jennifer Quint, Imperial College London, UK Professor Mark Griffiths, Imperial College London, UK Professor Cecilia O'Kane, Queen's University Belfast, UK

Publication details
- History: 1946-present
- Publisher: BMJ Group on behalf of the British Thoracic Society (United Kingdom)
- Frequency: Monthly
- Open access: Hybrid
- Impact factor: 9.1 (2025)

Standard abbreviations
- ISO 4: Thorax

Indexing
- ISSN: 0040-6376 (print); 1468-3296 (web)
- OCLC no.: 231027629

Links
- Journal homepage; Online access; Online archive

Thorax is a monthly peer-reviewed medical journal specialising in both clinical and experimental research articles on respiratory medicine as well as paediatrics, immunology, pharmacology, pathology, and surgery. It was established in 1946 and is published by the BMJ Group on behalf of the British Thoracic Society. The journal is available online by subscription and archived editions of the journal are available free of charge after 1 year. The editors-in-chief are

Professor Jennifer Quint, Imperial College London, UK

Professor Mark Griffiths, Imperial College London, UK

Professor Cecilia O'Kane, Queen's University Belfast, UK

== Abstracting and indexing ==
Thorax is abstracted and indexed by MEDLINE/Index Medicus, Science Citation Index, Current Contents, Excerpta Medica, and BIOSIS Previews. According to the Journal Citation Reports, the journal has a 2023 impact factor of 10.8.
