= Blalock–Thomas–Taussig shunt =

Cardiac surgery procedure

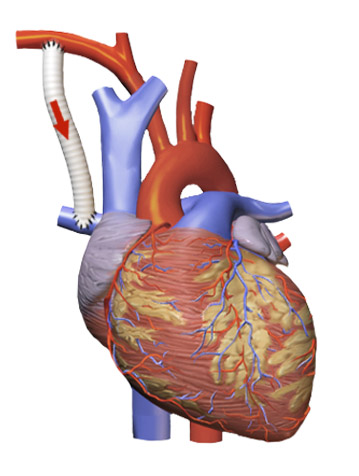
- Modified Blalock–Thomas–Taussig Shunt connecting right subclavian artery to pulmonary artery
- Other names: Blalock–Taussig shunt, BTT shunt
- Specialty: Cardiothoracic surgery
- Uses: Pulmonary atresia, tetralogy of Fallot
- Complications: Chylothorax, phrenic nerve injury, pulmonary oedema, shunt stenosis, subclavian steal syndrome
- Approach: Thoracotomy or sternotomy
- Types: Classical, modified

The Blalock–Thomas–Taussig shunt (BTT shunt), previously known as the Blalock–Taussig Shunt (BT shunt), is a surgical procedure used to increase blood flow to the lungs in some forms of congenital heart disease such as pulmonary atresia and tetralogy of Fallot, which are common causes of blue baby syndrome. The procedure involves connecting a branch of the subclavian artery or carotid artery to the pulmonary artery. In modern practice, this procedure is temporarily used to direct blood flow to the lungs and relieve cyanosis while the infant is waiting for corrective or definitive surgery when their heart is larger. The BTT shunt is used in the first step of the three-stage palliation (the Norwood procedure).

== Alternatives ==
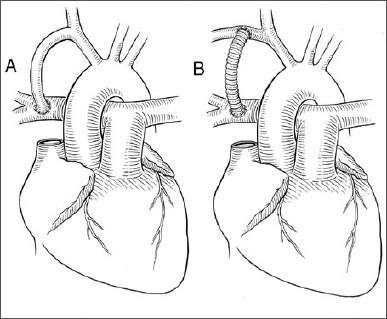
Blalock–Thomas–Taussig shunt – A) original procedure – B) modified procedure

While the originally described Blalock–Thomas–Taussig shunt directly connected the subclavian and pulmonary arteries, in contemporary practice a modified version of the procedure, the mBTT shunt, is more commonly used. In the modified Blalock–Thomas–Taussig shunt, a length of artificial tubing typically made from PTFE (Teflon) is sewn between either the subclavian or the carotid artery and the corresponding side branch of the pulmonary artery. This modification removes the need to cut off blood supply and makes it easier to regulate the blood flow to the lungs. Some centers now use a shunt directly from the right ventricle to the pulmonary artery, a Sano shunt. This is done to avoid the reduced diastolic blood flow in the coronary circulation associated with the mBTT shunt.

== History ==
The original procedure was named for Alfred Blalock, surgeon, Culloden, GA (1899–1964), Helen B. Taussig, cardiologist, Baltimore/Boston (1898–1986) and Vivien Thomas (1910–1985) who was at that time Blalock's laboratory assistant. They all helped to develop the procedure. Taussig, who treated hundreds of infants and children with this disorder, had observed that children with a cyanotic heart defect and a patent ductus arteriosus (PDA) lived longer than those without the PDA. It, therefore, seemed to her that a shunt that mimicked the function of a PDA might relieve the tetralogy patients' poor oxygenation. In 1943, having broached the possibility of a surgical solution to Robert Gross of Boston without success, Taussig approached Blalock and Thomas in their Hopkins laboratory in 1943. According to the account of the original consultation between the three provided in Vivien Thomas' 1985 autobiography Partners of the Heart, Taussig carefully described the anomaly of Tetralogy of Fallot, but made no suggestion about the specific surgical correction required, observing merely that it should be possible to get more blood to the lungs, "as a plumber changes pipes around." Although Taussig was not aware of it at that time, Blalock and Thomas had already experimented with such an anastomosis, one that Blalock had conceived years earlier for a different purpose but which had the unanticipated effect of re-routing blood to the lungs. The operation involved the joining of the subclavian artery to the pulmonary artery. After meeting with Taussig, the two men set about perfecting the operation in the animal lab, with Thomas performing the subclavian-to-pulmonary anastomosis alone in some 200 laboratory dogs, then adapting the instruments for the first human surgery from those used on the experimental animals and coaching Blalock through the first 100 operations on infants.

Thomas' autobiographical account, corroborated by the participants in the early tetralogy operations (Denton Cooley and the late William P. Longmire Jr., intern and resident respectively during the surgery) has led to the recent conclusion that Thomas' contribution, both experimentally and clinically, was so critical that he should have received credit for the procedure along with Blalock and Taussig. However, because of the racial prejudices of the time, and the academic custom which generally precluded mention of non-degreed lab assistants (Thomas had no formal education beyond high school), he did not receive the honor of having the shunt named after him. The 2004 HBO television movie Something the Lord Made, based on Washingtonian writer Katie McCabe's 1989 article of the same name, was made about his role in the historic Blue Baby surgery, as was the 2003 public television documentary Partners of the Heart.

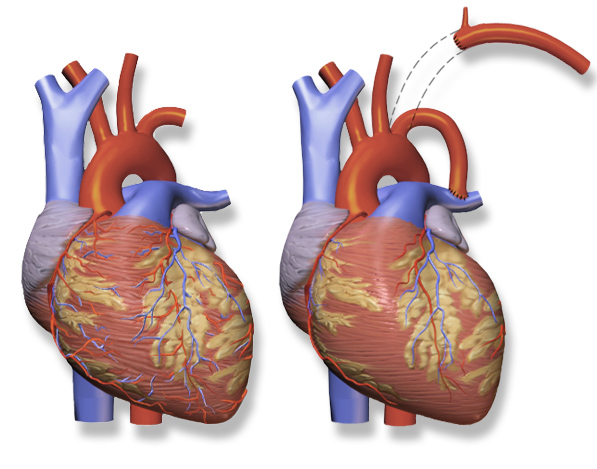
Blalock–Thomas–Taussig Shunt – left subclavian artery to left pulmonary artery.
