= Richard S. Ross =

American cardiologist (1924–2015)

- Born: Richard Starr Ross; January 18, 1924; Richmond, Indiana
- Died: August 11, 2015 (aged 91); Baltimore, Maryland
- Education: Harvard University
- Occupations: Cardiologist, Dean of Johns Hopkins Medical School
- Spouse: Elizabeth McCracken Ross

Richard Starr Ross (January 18, 1924 – August 11, 2015) was an American cardiologist and served as Dean of Johns Hopkins University's School of Medicine from 1975 to 1990. He examined Richard M. Nixon for the Watergate investigation.

Ross was born in Richmond, Indiana. After graduating from Richmond High School, he began his undergraduate studies at Harvard in 1942, and because of the accelerated academic program during World War II, he entered Harvard Medical School without finishing his undergraduate degree. He graduated cum laude in 1947, then moved to Baltimore, where he planned to spend a year on the Osler Medical Service at Hopkins as an intern and then return to Boston. In a 1974 interview with The Baltimore Sun, he said, "I fell in love with this place." After completing one year of his residency at Hopkins, Ross joined the Army Medical Corps and served as a captain and chief of cardiovascular medicine with the 141st General Hospital in the Far East during the Korean War. He returned to Hopkins in 1951 and after completing a second year of medical residency, returned to Harvard to serve as a fellow in physiology from 1952 to 1953, when he again returned to Hopkins as chief medical resident.

Ross became associated with Helen Taussig, a renowned pediatric cardiologist, who along with the surgeon Alfred Blalock and laboratory technician Vivien Thomas perfected the "blue baby" operation that established the field of cardiac surgery. Along with Taussig, he cared for adults with congenital heart disease who were coming from all across the world because of her renown. He also joined her in studying pulmonary hypertension in the young patents who had undergone the "blue baby" operation. Beginning his research in 1960, he developed and introduced an X-ray movie technique — coronary cineangiography — for diagnosing and studying methods to treat coronary artery and vascular heart disease. This technique has resulted in making it possible for cardiologists to obtain precise information on the structure of the heart arteries in living people. He became a staunch advocate of preventive medicine in forestalling heart disease. He urged physicians to counsel their patients in the three risk factors associated with heart disease: hypertension, cigarette smoking, and high cholesterol levels.

Ross moved through the school's academic ranks, achieving directorship of the cardiology division at Johns Hopkins in 1961, head of its Wellcome Research Laboratory and full professorship in the medical school in 1965. He was named the Clayton Professor of Cardiovascular Disease in 1969. He served as president of the American Heart Association from 1973 to 1974.

Ross' expertise in cardiology was such that in 1974, he was one of three physicians asked by Judge John Sirica, chief judge of the U.S. District Court in Washington, to examine former U.S. president Richard M. Nixon at his home in San Clemente, California, to see if he was fit enough to testify at the Watergate hearings. They unanimously concluded that the former president was too ill to travel to Washington. Ross died of complications related to Parkinson's disease at his home in Baltimore, Maryland on August 11, 2015.
