= 56th Primetime Emmy Awards =

2004 American television programming awards

- Title card
- Date: September 19, 2004 (Ceremony); September 12, 2004 (Creative Arts Awards)
- Location: Shrine Auditorium, Los Angeles, California
- Presented by: Academy of Television Arts and Sciences
- Hosted by: Garry Shandling

Highlights
- Most awards: Major: Angels in America (7); All: Angels in America (11)
- Most nominations: The Sopranos (12)
- Outstanding Comedy Series: Arrested Development
- Outstanding Drama Series: The Sopranos
- Outstanding Miniseries: Angels in America
- Outstanding Reality-Competition Program: The Amazing Race
- Outstanding Variety, Music or Comedy Series: The Daily Show with Jon Stewart

Television/radio coverage
- Network: ABC
- Produced by: Don Mischer
- Directed by: Louis J. Horvitz

The 56th Primetime Emmy Awards were held on Sunday, September 19, 2004. The ceremony was hosted by Garry Shandling and was broadcast on ABC. 27 awards were presented.

The HBO miniseries Angels in America had the most successful night. It became the first program to sweep every major category, going 7/7, in Emmy history, until 2020 when Schitt’s Creek repeated the feat. Along with Schitt’s Creek, Caesar's Hour in 1957 and The Crown in 2021, it is one of only four programs to win all four main acting categories.

Upstart comedy series Arrested Development won Outstanding Comedy Series (being the second time Fox won that specific award) and two other major awards overall. Its pilot became the twelfth episode to accomplish the directing/writing double.

After years of winning everything but the top prize, The Sopranos finally took home the crown for Outstanding Drama Series, not only knocking off four-time defending champion The West Wing but by being the first cable show, HBO, ever to beat any of the Big Four television networks for that award. It led all dramas with twelve major nominations and four major wins. One of those wins was for Drea de Matteo for Drama Supporting Actress and, too, was the first time that award went to a cable network. Furthermore, the cable network also won for the first times in the Comedy Lead Actress and Comedy Supporting Actress categories (Sarah Jessica Parker and Cynthia Nixon respectively for Sex and the City).

Entering its final ceremony, five-time series champion Frasier needed five major wins to tie The Mary Tyler Moore Show's record of 27 major wins. Because it was only nominated in three major categories, breaking the record was not possible. Though it did not tie the record, Frasier finished its Emmy career on a high note, winning two major awards, the most it had won since 1998. Its 25 major wins put it at second of all time. When adding its wins in technical categories, its total rises to 37, the most for any comedy series.

== Winners and nominees ==
Winners are listed first and highlighted in bold:

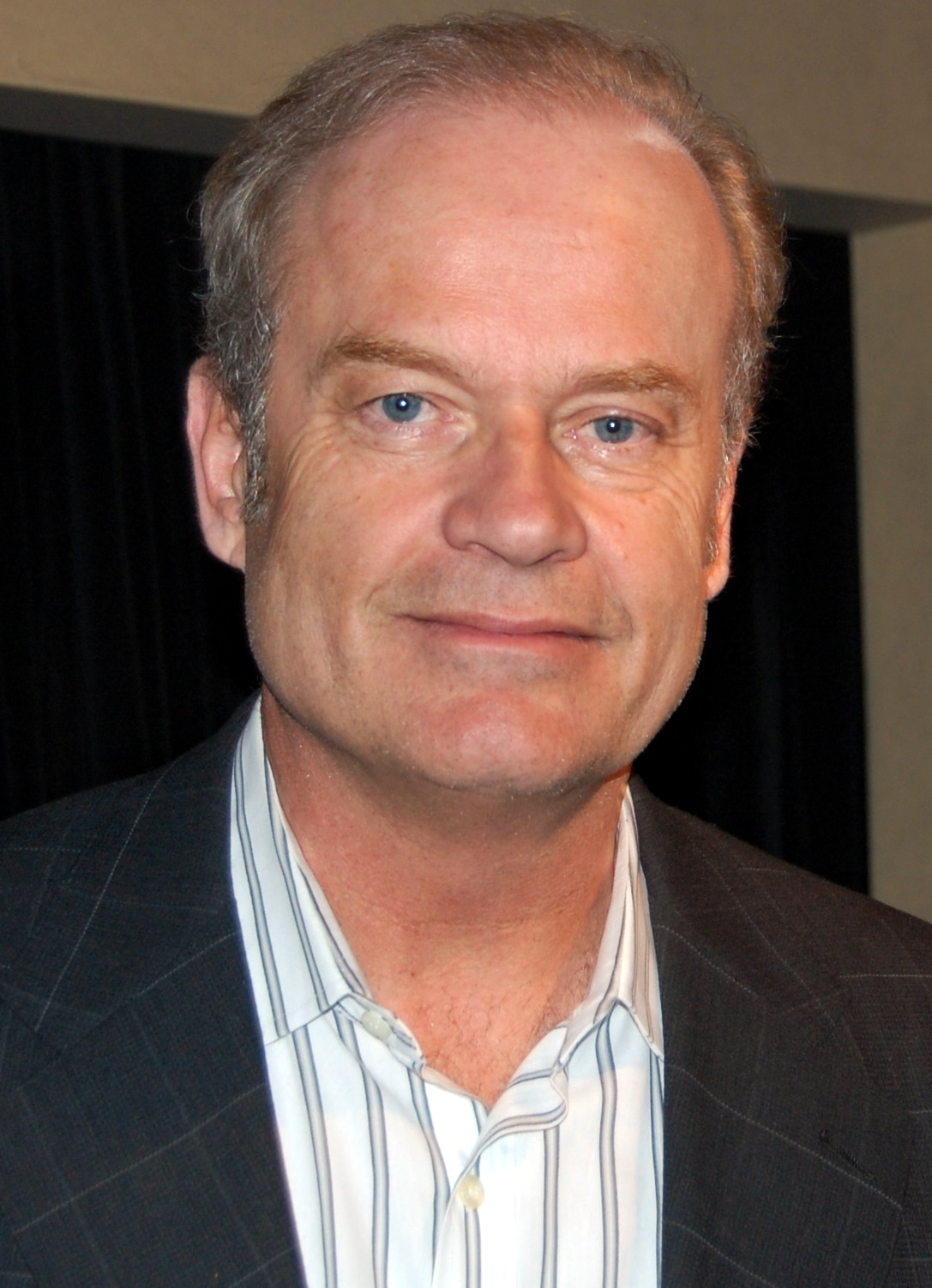
Kelsey Grammer, Outstanding Lead Actor in a Comedy Series winner

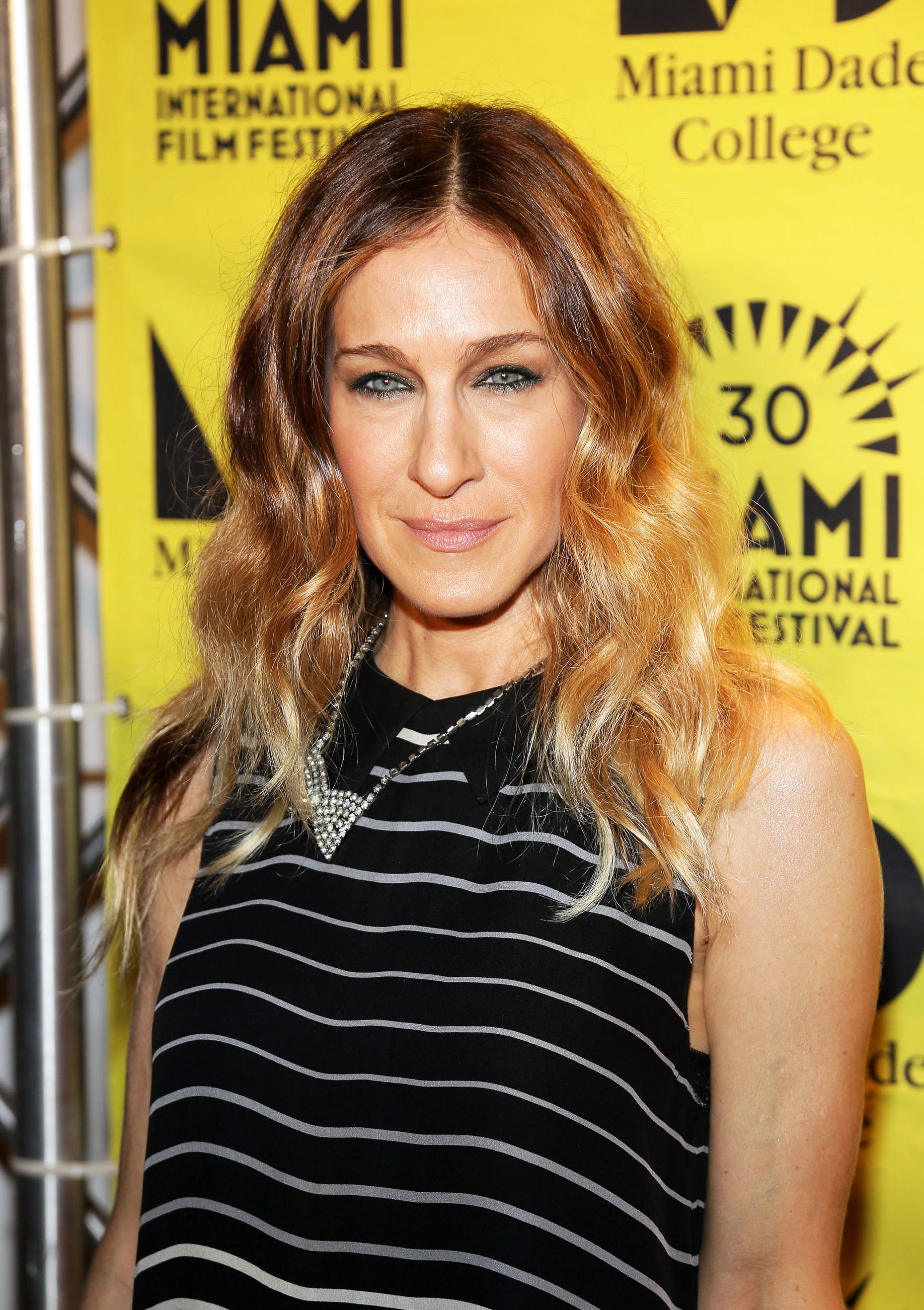
Sarah Jessica Parker, Outstanding Lead Actress in a Comedy Series winner

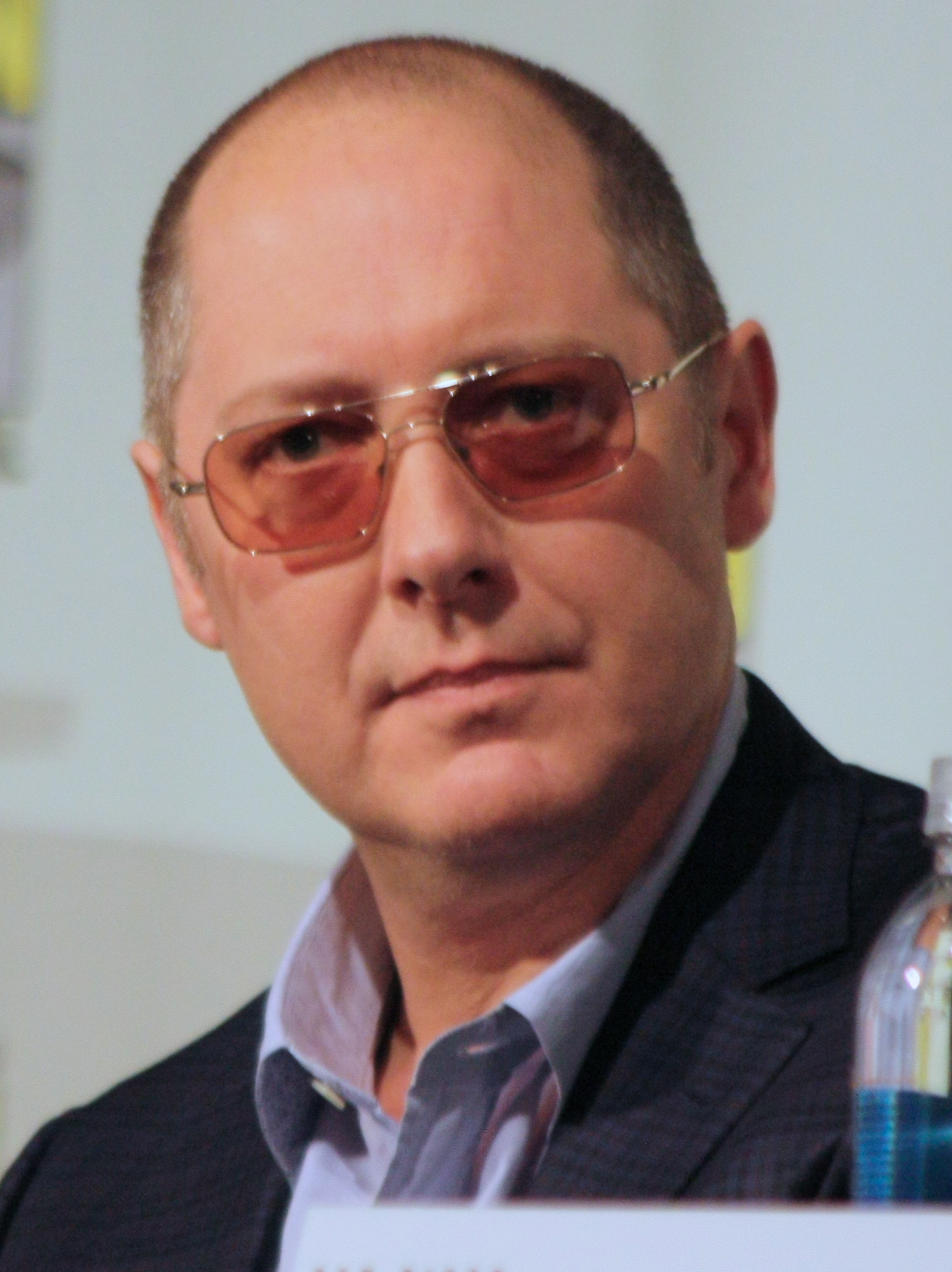
James Spader, Outstanding Lead Actor in a Drama Series winner

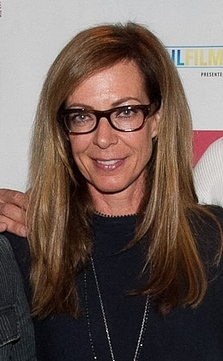
Allison Janney, Outstanding Lead Actress in a Drama Series winner

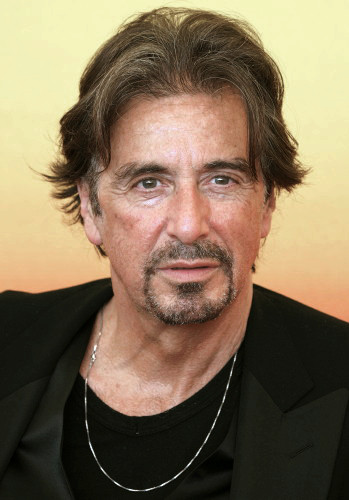
Al Pacino, Outstanding Lead Actor in a Miniseries or Movie winner

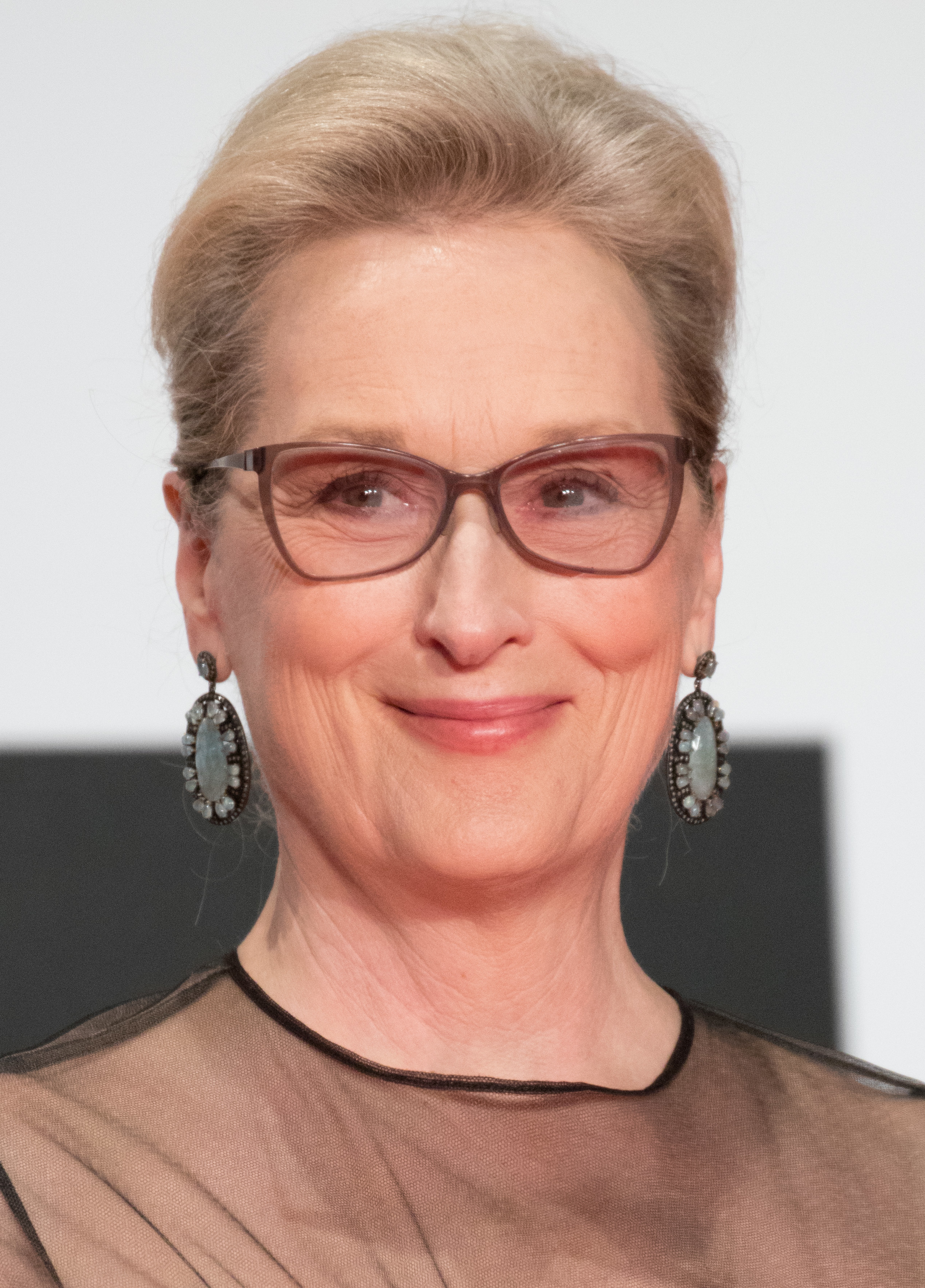
Meryl Streep, Outstanding Lead Actress in a Miniseries or Movie winner

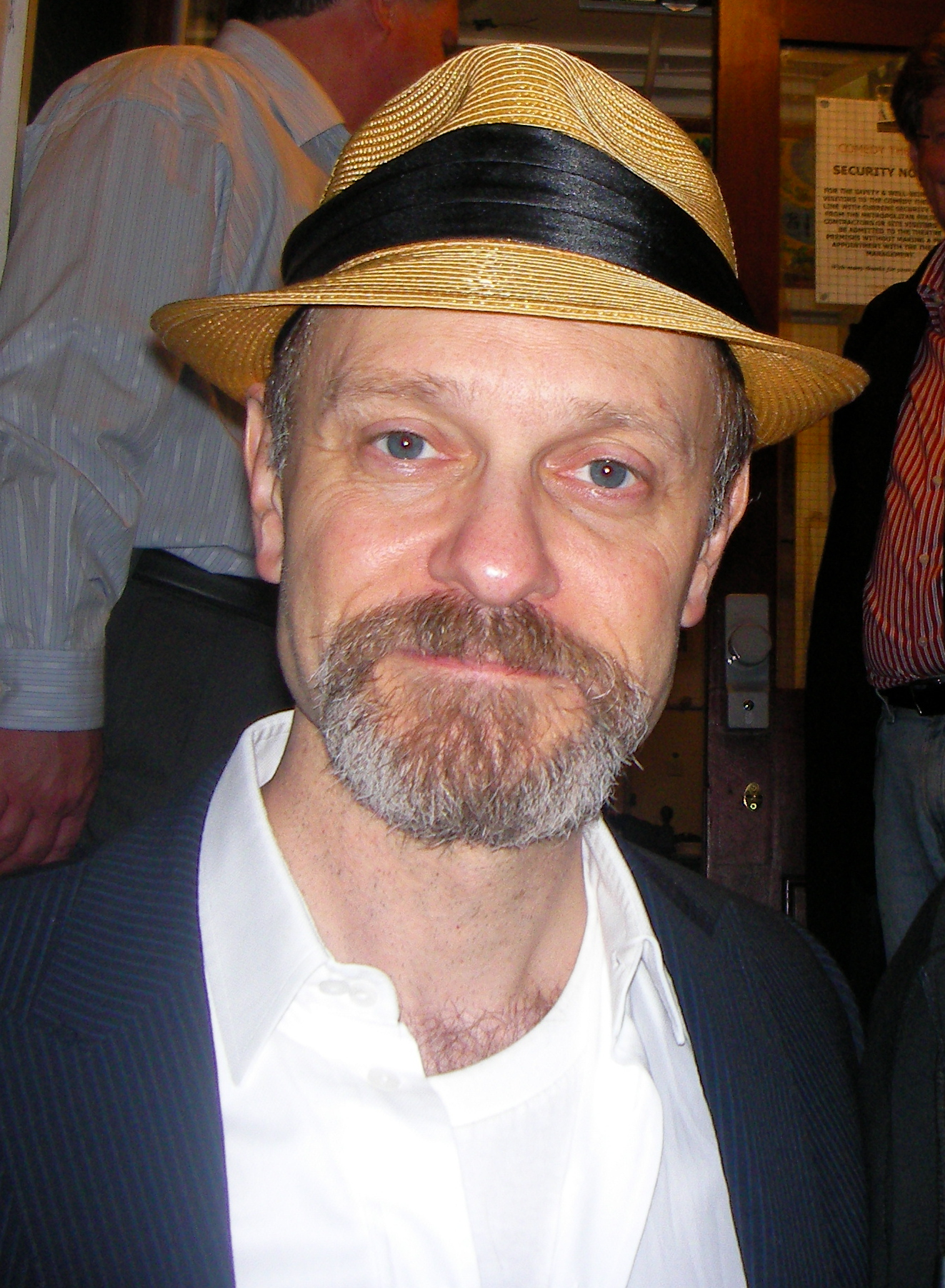
David Hyde Pierce, Outstanding Supporting Actor in a Comedy Series winner

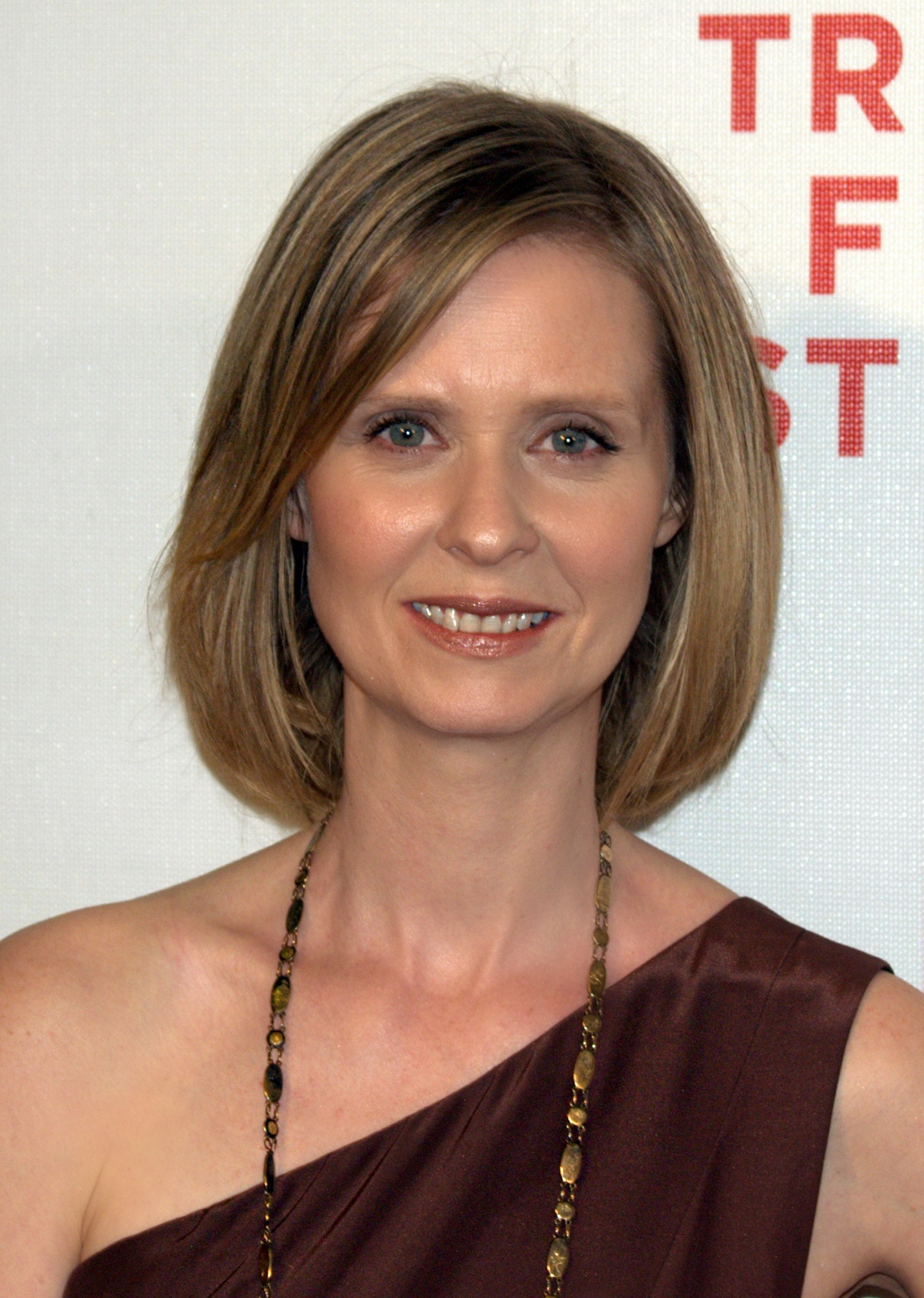
Cynthia Nixon, Outstanding Supporting Actress in a Comedy Series winner

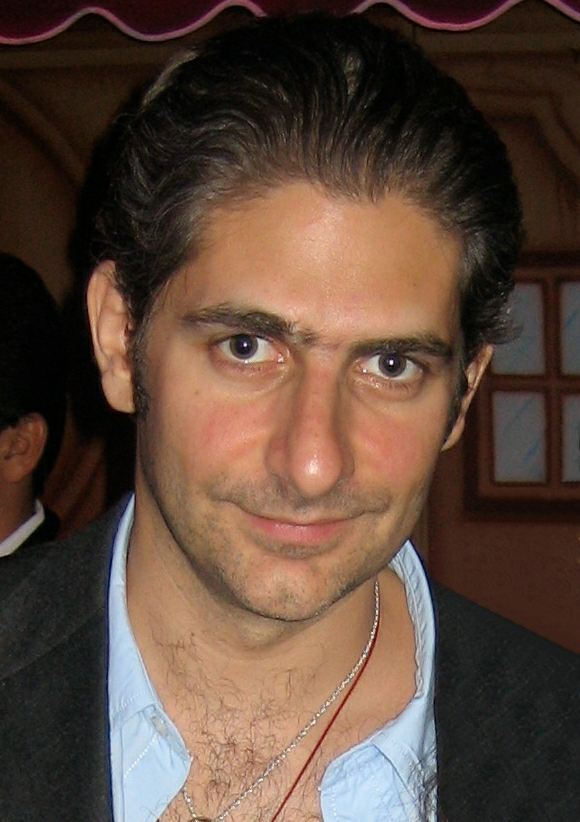
Michael Imperioli, Outstanding Supporting Actor in a Drama Series winner

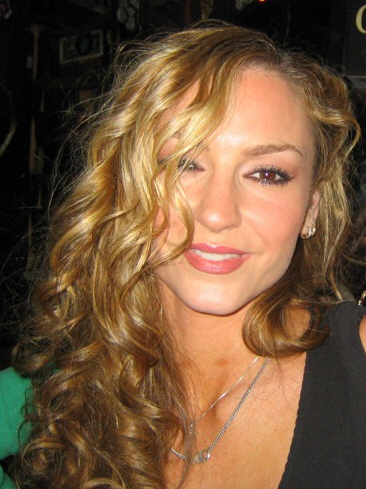
Drea de Matteo, Outstanding Supporting Actress in a Drama Series winner

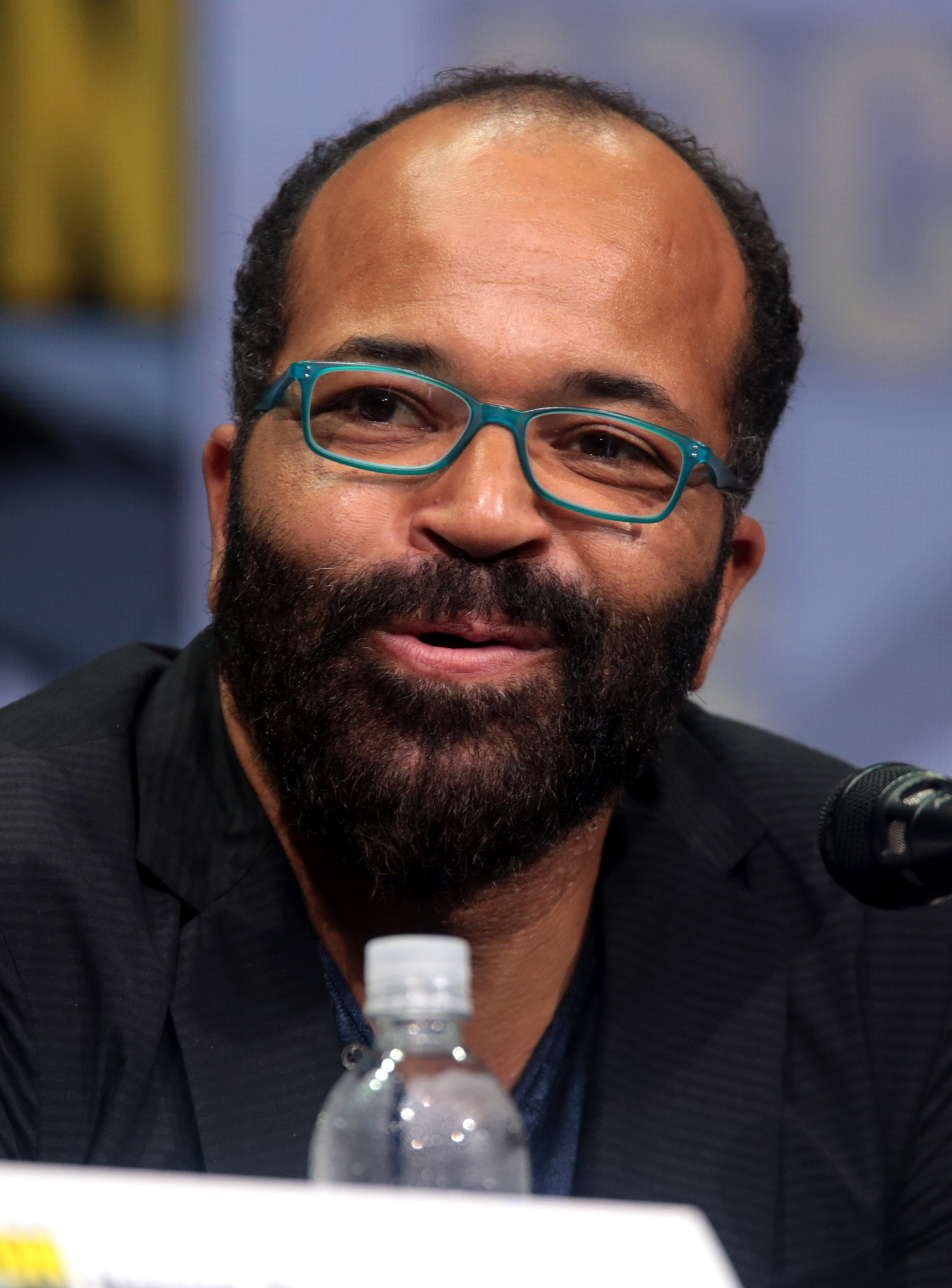
Jeffrey Wright, Outstanding Supporting Actor in a Miniseries or Movie winner

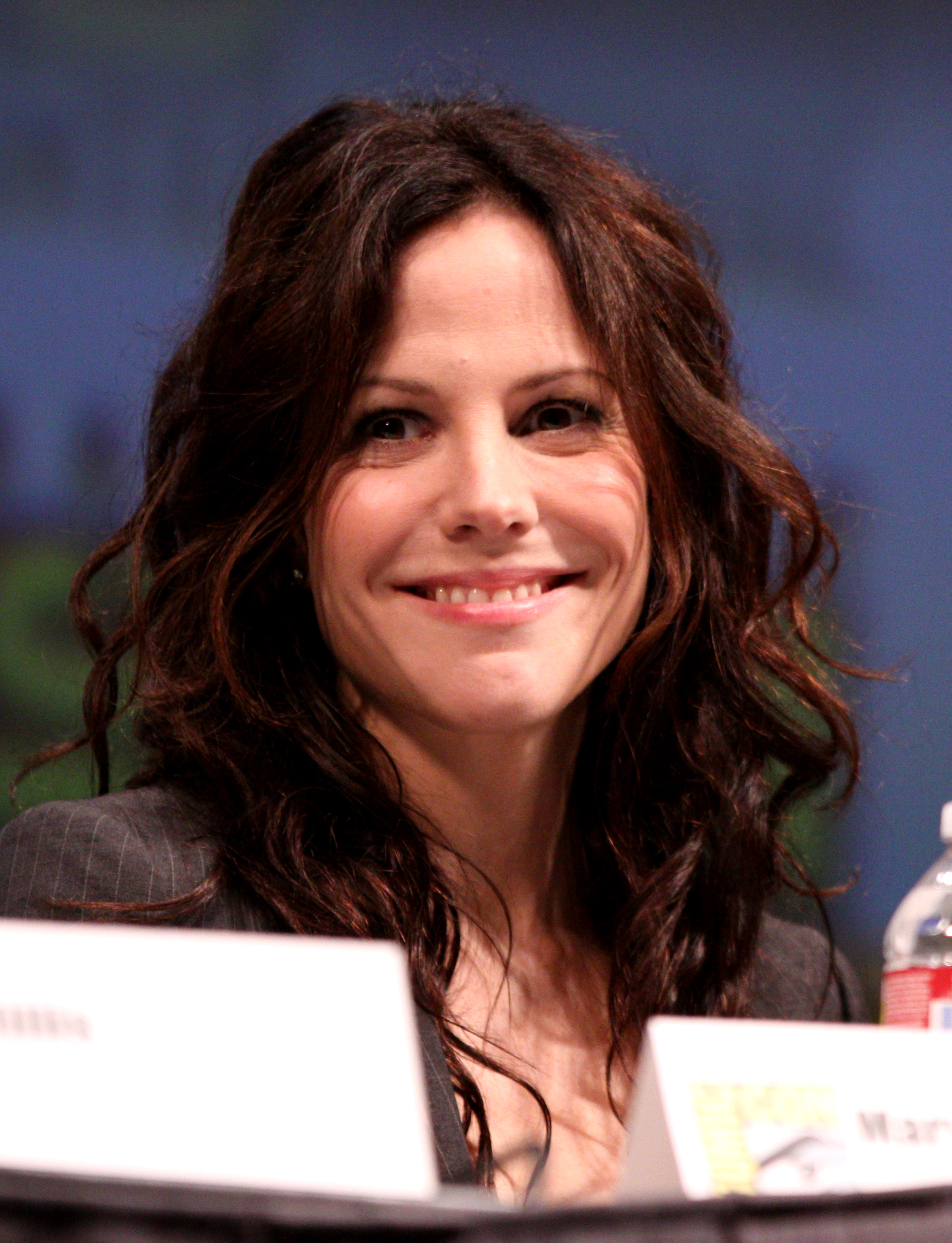
Mary-Louise Parker, Outstanding Supporting Actress in a Miniseries or Movie winner

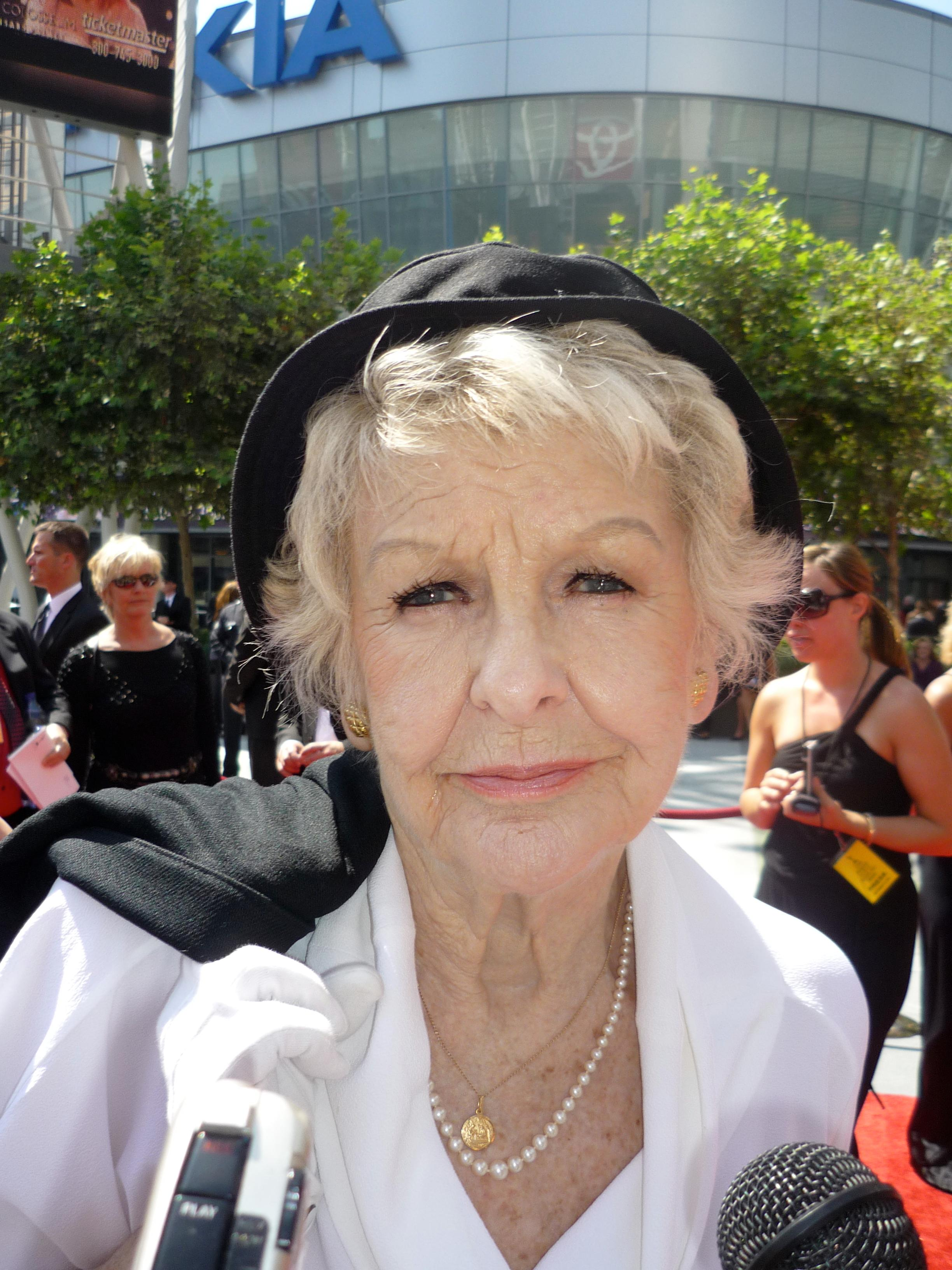
Elaine Stritch, Outstanding Individual Performance in a Variety or Music Program winner

=== Programs ===
Programs
**Outstanding Comedy Series**: **Arrested Development (Fox)**; Curb Your Enthusiasm (HBO); Everybody Loves Raymond (CBS); Sex and the City (HBO); Will & Grace (NBC)	**Outstanding Drama Series**: **The Sopranos (HBO)**; 24 (Fox); CSI: Crime Scene Investigation (CBS); Joan of Arcadia (CBS); The West Wing (NBC)
**Outstanding Made for Television Movie**: **Something the Lord Made (HBO)**; And Starring Pancho Villa as Himself (HBO); Ike: Countdown to D-Day (A&E); The Lion in Winter (Showtime); The Reagans (Showtime)	**Outstanding Miniseries**: **Angels in America (HBO)**; American Family (PBS); Hornblower (A&E); Prime Suspect VI: The Last Witness (PBS); Traffic (USA)
**Outstanding Variety, Music or Comedy Series**: **The Daily Show with Jon Stewart (Comedy Central)**; Chappelle's Show (Comedy Central); Late Night with Conan O'Brien (NBC); Late Show with David Letterman (CBS); Saturday Night Live (NBC)	**Outstanding Reality-Competition Program**: **The Amazing Race (CBS)**; American Idol (Fox); The Apprentice (NBC); Last Comic Standing (NBC); Survivor (CBS)

=== Acting ===
==== Lead performances ====
Lead performances
**Outstanding Lead Actor in a Comedy Series**: **Kelsey Grammer – Frasier as Dr. Frasier Crane (NBC)**; Larry David – Curb Your Enthusiasm as himself (HBO); Matt LeBlanc – Friends as Joey Tribbiani (NBC); John Ritter – 8 Simple Rules as Paul Hennessy (ABC) (posthumous) Episode: “(Premiere”); Tony Shalhoub – Monk as Adrian Monk (USA)	**Outstanding Lead Actress in a Comedy Series**: **Sarah Jessica Parker – Sex and the City as Carrie Bradshaw (HBO)**; Jennifer Aniston – Friends as Rachel Green (NBC); Patricia Heaton – Everybody Loves Raymond as Debra Barone (CBS) Episode: (“Fun With Debra”); Bonnie Hunt – Life with Bonnie as Bonnie Molloy (ABC); Jane Kaczmarek – Malcolm in the Middle as Lois (Fox) Episode: (“Block Party”)
**Outstanding Lead Actor in a Drama Series**: **James Spader – The Practice as Alan Shore (ABC)**; James Gandolfini – The Sopranos as Tony Soprano (HBO); Anthony LaPaglia – Without a Trace as Jack Malone (CBS); Martin Sheen – The West Wing as President Jed Bartlet (NBC); Kiefer Sutherland – 24 as Jack Bauer (Fox)	**Outstanding Lead Actress in a Drama Series**: **Allison Janney – The West Wing as C. J. Cregg (NBC)**; Edie Falco – The Sopranos as Carmela Soprano (HBO); Jennifer Garner – Alias as Sydney Bristow (ABC); Mariska Hargitay – Law & Order: Special Victims Unit as Olivia Benson (NBC); Amber Tamblyn – Joan of Arcadia as Joan Girardi (CBS)
**Outstanding Lead Actor in a Miniseries or Movie**: **Al Pacino – Angels in America as Roy Cohn (HBO)**; Antonio Banderas – And Starring Pancho Villa as Himself as Pancho Villa (HBO); James Brolin – The Reagans as President Ronald Reagan (Showtime); Mos Def – Something the Lord Made as Vivien Thomas (HBO); Alan Rickman – Something the Lord Made as Alfred Blalock (HBO)	**Outstanding Lead Actress in a Miniseries or Movie**: **Meryl Streep – Angels in America as Hannah Pitt / Ethel Rosenberg / the Rabbi / the Angel Australia (HBO)**; Glenn Close – The Lion in Winter as Eleanor of Aquitaine (Showtime); Judy Davis – The Reagans as First Lady Nancy Reagan (Showtime); Helen Mirren – Prime Suspect VI: The Last Witness as DCI Jane Tennison (PBS); Emma Thompson – Angels in America as Nurse Emily / Homeless Woman / the Angel America (HBO)
**Outstanding Individual Performance in a Variety or Music Program**: **Elaine Stritch – Elaine Stritch: At Liberty (HBO)**; Billy Crystal – 76th Annual Academy Awards (ABC); Ellen DeGeneres – Ellen DeGeneres: Here and Now (HBO); Bill Maher – Real Time with Bill Maher (HBO); Tracey Ullman – Tracey Ullman in The Trailer Tales (HBO)

==== Supporting performances ====
Supporting performances
**Outstanding Supporting Actor in a Comedy Series**: **David Hyde Pierce – Frasier as Dr. Niles Crane (NBC)**; Peter Boyle – Everybody Loves Raymond as Frank Barone (CBS) Episodes: (“Jazz Records” and “The Mentor”); Brad Garrett – Everybody Loves Raymond as Robert Barone (CBS) Episodes: (“The Model” and “Golf for it”; Sean Hayes – Will & Grace as Jack McFarland (NBC); Jeffrey Tambor – Arrested Development as George Bluth Sr. (Fox)	**Outstanding Supporting Actress in a Comedy Series**: **Cynthia Nixon – Sex and the City as Miranda Hobbes (HBO)**; Kim Cattrall – Sex and the City as Samantha Jones (HBO); Kristin Davis – Sex and the City as Charlotte York Goldenblatt (HBO); Megan Mullally – Will & Grace as Karen Walker (NBC); Doris Roberts – Everybody Loves Raymond as Marie Barone (CBS) Episodes: (“Thank you notes” and “Liars”)
**Outstanding Supporting Actor in a Drama Series**: **Michael Imperioli – The Sopranos as Christopher Moltisanti (HBO)**; Steve Buscemi – The Sopranos as Tony Blundetto (HBO); Brad Dourif – Deadwood as Doc Cochran (HBO); Victor Garber – Alias as Jack Bristow (ABC); John Spencer – The West Wing as Leo McGarry (NBC)	**Outstanding Supporting Actress in a Drama Series**: **Drea de Matteo – The Sopranos as Adriana La Cerva (HBO)**; Stockard Channing – The West Wing as First Lady Abbey Bartlet (NBC); Tyne Daly – Judging Amy as Maxine Gray (CBS); Janel Moloney – The West Wing as Donna Moss (NBC); Robin Weigert – Deadwood as Calamity Jane (HBO)
**Outstanding Supporting Actor in a Miniseries or Movie**: **Jeffrey Wright – Angels in America as Mr. Lies / Norman "Belize" Ariaga / Homeless Man / the Angel Europa (HBO)**; Justin Kirk – Angels in America as Prior Walter / Leatherman in Park (HBO); William H. Macy – Stealing Sinatra as John Irwin (Showtime); Ben Shenkman – Angels in America as Louis Ironson / the Angel Oceania (HBO); Patrick Wilson – Angels in America as Joe Pitt / the Antarctic Eskimo / Mormon Father (HBO)	**Outstanding Supporting Actress in a Miniseries or Movie**: **Mary-Louise Parker – Angels in America as Harper Pitt (HBO)**; Julie Andrews – Eloise at Christmastime as Nanny (ABC); Anne Heche – Gracie's Choice as Rowena Larson (Lifetime); Anjelica Huston – Iron Jawed Angels as Carrie Chapman Catt (HBO); Angela Lansbury – The Blackwater Lightship as Dora (CBS)

=== Directing ===
Directing
**Outstanding Directing for a Comedy Series**: **Arrested Development: "Pilot" – Anthony Russo and Joe Russo (Fox)**; Curb Your Enthusiasm: "The Car Pool Lane" – Robert B. Weide (HBO); Curb Your Enthusiasm: "The 5 Wood" – Bryan Gordon (HBO); Curb Your Enthusiasm: "The Survivor" – Larry Charles (HBO); Sex and the City: "An American Girl in Paris: Part Deux" – Tim Van Patten (HBO)	**Outstanding Directing for a Drama Series**: **Deadwood: "Deadwood" – Walter Hill (HBO)**; ER: "The Lost" – Christopher Chulack (NBC); Nip/Tuck: "Pilot" – Ryan Murphy (FX); The Sopranos: "Irregular Around the Margins" – Allen Coulter (HBO); The Sopranos: "Long Term Parking" – Tim Van Patten (HBO)
**Outstanding Directing for a Variety, Music or Comedy Program**: **76th Annual Academy Awards – Louis J. Horvitz (ABC)**; Bill Maher: Victory Begins at Home – John Moffitt (HBO); Chappelle's Show – Neal Brennan, Andre Allen, and Scott Vincent (Comedy Central); The Daily Show with Jon Stewart – Chuck O'Neil (Comedy Central); Elaine Stritch: At Liberty – Andy Picheta, Nick Doob, Chris Hegedus, and D. A. Pennebaker (HBO); Late Show with David Letterman – Jerry Foley (CBS)	**Outstanding Directing for a Miniseries, Movie or Dramatic Special**: **Angels in America – Mike Nichols (HBO)**; Ike: Countdown to D-Day – Robert Harmon (A&E); The Lion in Winter – Andrey Konchalovskiy (Showtime); Prime Suspect VI: The Last Witness – Tom Hooper (PBS); Something the Lord Made – Joseph Sargent (HBO)

=== Writing ===
Writing
**Outstanding Writing for a Comedy Series**: **Arrested Development: "Pilot" – Mitchell Hurwitz (Fox)**; Frasier: "Goodnight, Seattle" – Christopher Lloyd and Joe Keenan (NBC); Sex and the City: "An American Girl in Paris: Part Deux" – Michael Patrick King (HBO); Sex and the City: "The Ick Factor" – Julie Rottenberg and Elisa Zuritsky (HBO); Scrubs: "My Screw Up" – Neil Goldman and Garrett Donovan (NBC)	**Outstanding Writing for a Drama Series**: **The Sopranos: "Long Term Parking" – Terence Winter (HBO)**; Deadwood: "Deadwood" – David Milch (HBO); The Sopranos: "Irregular Around the Margins" – Robin Green and Mitchell Burgess (HBO); The Sopranos: "Unidentified Black Males" – Matthew Weiner and Terence Winter (HBO); The Sopranos: "Where's Johnny?" – Michael Caleo (HBO)
**Outstanding Writing for a Variety, Music or Comedy Program**: **The Daily Show with Jon Stewart (Comedy Central)**; Chappelle's Show (Comedy Central); Chris Rock: Never Scared (HBO); Late Night with Conan O'Brien (NBC); Late Show with David Letterman (CBS)	**Outstanding Writing for a Miniseries, Movie or Dramatic Special**: **Angels in America – Tony Kushner (HBO)**; And Starring Pancho Villa as Himself – Larry Gelbart (HBO); Iron Jawed Angels – Sally Robinson, Eugenia Bostwick-Singer, Raymond Singer, and Jennifer Friedes (HBO); The Reagans – Jane Marchwood, Thomas Rickman, and Elizabeth Egloff (Showtime); Something the Lord Made – Peter Silverman and Robert Caswell (HBO)

== Most major nominations ==
Networks with multiple major nominations (Note: "Major" constitutes the categories listed above: Program, Acting, Directing, and Writing. Does not include the technical categories.)
Networks	No. of Nominations
HBO	56
NBC	33
CBS	19
ABC	12

Programs with multiple major nominations
Program	Category	Network	No. of Nominations
The Sopranos	Drama	HBO	12
Angels in America	Miniseries	HBO	11
Sex and the City	Comedy	HBO	8
The West Wing	Drama	NBC	6
Curb Your Enthusiasm	Comedy	HBO	5
Everybody Loves Raymond	Comedy	CBS	5
Something the Lord Made	Movie	HBO	5
Arrested Development	Comedy	Fox	4
Deadwood	Drama	HBO	4
The Reagans	Movie	Showtime	4
And Starring Pancho Villa as Himself	Movie	HBO	3
Chappelle's Show	Variety	Comedy Central	3
The Daily Show with Jon Stewart	Variety	Comedy Central	3
Frasier	Comedy	NBC	3
Late Show with David Letterman	Variety	CBS	3
The Lion in Winter	Movie	Showtime	3
Prime Suspect VI: The Last Witness	Miniseries	PBS	3
Will & Grace	Comedy	NBC	3
24	Drama	Fox	2
The 76th Annual Academy Awards	Variety	ABC	2
Alias	Drama	ABC	2
Elaine Stritch: At Liberty	Variety	HBO	2
Friends	Comedy	NBC	2
Ike: Countdown to D-Day	Movie	A&E	2
Iron Jawed Angels	Movie	HBO	2
Joan of Arcadia	Drama	CBS	2
Late Night with Conan O'Brien	Variety	NBC	2

== Most major awards ==
Networks with multiple major awards
Network	No. of Awards
HBO	16
Fox	3
NBC	3
ABC	2
Comedy Central	2

Programs with multiple major awards
Program	Category	Network	No. of Awards
Angels in America	Miniseries	HBO	7
The Sopranos	Drama	HBO	4
Arrested Development	Comedy	Fox	3
The Daily Show with Jon Stewart	Variety	Comedy Central	2
Frasier	Comedy	NBC	2
Sex and the City	Comedy	HBO	2

== Presenters ==
The awards were presented by the following people:

Presenter(s)	Role(s)
Sarah Jessica Parker; Chris Noth	Presented the award for Outstanding Supporting Actor in a Comedy Series
Heather Locklear; Blair Underwood	Presented the award for Outstanding Supporting Actor in a Drama Series
Simon Cowell; Donald Trump	Presented the award for Outstanding Supporting Actress in a Comedy Series
Laura Linney; John Turturro	Presented the award for Outstanding Directing for a Comedy Series
Jim Belushi; Teri Hatcher	Presented the award for Outstanding Writing for a Comedy Series
Amber Tamblyn; Zach Braff	Presented the award for Outstanding Supporting Actress in a Drama Series
Mischa Barton; Adam Brody; Ben McKenzie	Presented the award for Outstanding Directing for a Drama Series
Debra Messing; Eric McCormack	Presented the award for Outstanding Supporting Actor in a Miniseries or Movie
Jimmy Kimmel; Ty Pennington	Presented the award for Outstanding Directing for a Variety, Music or Comedy Program
Jon Stewart	Presented the award for Outstanding Individual Performance in a Variety or Music Program
Mos Def; Tony Shalhoub	Presented the award for Outstanding Writing for a Variety, Music or Comedy Program
Sharon Stone; William Shatner	Presented the award for Outstanding Writing for a Drama Series
William Petersen; Dennis Franz	Presented the award for Outstanding Supporting Actress in a Miniseries or Movie
George Lopez	Presented the award for Outstanding Variety, Music or Comedy Series
Kathryn Morris; Anthony LaPaglia	Presented the award for Outstanding Writing for a Miniseries, Movie or Dramatic Special
Amy Jo Scholsohn and Bruce Milam Jr	Presented the award for Outstanding Reality-Competition Program
Joely Richardson; Kiefer Sutherland	Presented the award for Outstanding Made for Television Movie
Edie Falco; James Gandolfini	Presented the award for Outstanding Lead Actor in a Miniseries or Movie
Anjelica Huston; James Spader	Presented the award for Outstanding Directing for a Miniseries, Movie or Dramatic Special
Victor Garber; Taye Diggs	Presented the award for Outstanding Lead Actress in a Drama Series
Jon Cryer; Charlie Sheen	Presented the award for Outstanding Lead Actress in a Comedy Series
Conan O'Brien	Presented the award for Outstanding Lead Actor in a Comedy Series
Gary Sinise; Melina Kanakeredes	Presented the award for Outstanding Lead Actor in a Drama Series
Treat Williams; William H. Macy	Presented the award for Outstanding Lead Actress in a Miniseries or Movie
Barbara Walters	Presented the award for Outstanding Miniseries
Ellen DeGeneres	Presented the award for Outstanding Comedy Series
Glenn Close	Presented the award for Outstanding Drama Series

== In Memoriam ==
- Paul Winfield
- Alan King
- Julia Child
- June Taylor
- Bob Keeshan
- Ethel Winant
- Michael Kamen
- Jack Elam
- Rod Roddy
- Jack Paar
- Elmer Bernstein
- Jerry Goldsmith
- Donald O'Connor
- Ronald Reagan
- Anna Lee
- Gordon Jump
- Isabel Sanford
- Robert Pastorelli
- Daniel Petrie
- Mary-Ellis Bunim
- Ray Charles
- Marlon Brando
- Peter Ustinov
- Art Carney
- Tony Randall
- Alistair Cooke
