= Something the Lord Made =

2004 television film directed by Joseph Sargent

- Based on: "Like Something the Lord Made" by Katie McCabe
- Written by: Peter Silverman; Robert Caswell
- Directed by: Joseph Sargent
- Starring: Alan Rickman; Mos Def; Kyra Sedgwick; Gabrielle Union; Charles S. Dutton; Mary Stuart Masterson
- Original language: English

Production
- Producers: Robert W. Cort; David Madden; Eric Hetzel; Julian Krainin; Mike Drake
- Cinematography: Donald M. Morgan
- Editor: Michael Brown
- Running time: 110 mins
- Production companies: HBO Films; Nina Saxon Film Design

Original release
- Network: HBO
- Release: May 30, 2004

Something the Lord Made is a 2004 American made-for-television biographical drama film about the black cardiac surgery pioneer Vivien Thomas (1910–1985) and his complex and volatile partnership with white surgeon Alfred Blalock (1899–1964), the "Blue Baby doctor" who pioneered modern heart surgery. Based on the National Magazine Award-winning Washingtonian magazine article "Like Something the Lord Made" by Katie McCabe, the film was directed by Joseph Sargent and written by Peter Silverman and Robert Caswell.

== Plot ==
The film tells the story of the 34-year partnership that begins in Depression era Nashville in 1930 when Dr. Alfred Blalock hires Vivien Thomas as an assistant at his Vanderbilt University lab, expecting him to perform janitorial work. Thomas' remarkable manual dexterity and intellectual acumen confound Blalock's expectations, and Thomas rapidly becomes indispensable as a research partner to Blalock in his forays into heart surgery.

In 1943, Blalock and Thomas move from Vanderbilt to Johns Hopkins, an institution where the only black employees are janitors and where Thomas must enter by the back door. They attack the congenital heart defect of Tetralogy of Fallot, also known as blue baby syndrome, and in so doing they launch the field of heart surgery. Dr. Helen Taussig, the pediatrician/cardiologist at Johns Hopkins, challenges Blalock to come up with a surgical solution for her Blue Babies. She needs a new ductus for them to oxygenate their blood.

The duo is seen experimenting on stray dogs they got from the local dog pound, deliberately giving the dogs the heart defect and then trying to solve it. The outcome looks good and they are excited to operate on Eileen Saxon, a baby with the defect, but in a dream, Thomas sees the baby grown up and crying because she is dying. Thomas asks why she is dying in the dream and she says it is because she has a baby heart. Blalock interprets his dream as implying that their sewing technique did not work because the sutures failed to grow with the heart, and developed a new version with that feature.

The film dramatizes Blalock's and Thomas's fight to save the dying Blue Babies. Blalock praises Thomas's surgical skill as being "like something the Lord made", and insists that Thomas coach him through the first Blue Baby surgery over the protests of Johns Hopkins administrators. Despite their close partnership in the lab, outside they are separated by the prevailing racism. Blalock makes a mistake by accidentally cutting an artery at the wrong place, but with Thomas's assistance, is able to complete the surgery. As news quickly spreads of their successes, parents from all over the country flock to the hospital with their sick children, hoping that the surgery can cure them too. Doctors from around the world also come to learn from Thomas how to do the surgery to treat their Blue Baby Syndrome patients.

Thomas attends Blalock's parties as a bartender, moonlighting for extra income, and when Blalock is honored for the Blue Baby work at the segregated Belvedere Hotel, Thomas is not among the invited guests. Instead, he watches from behind a potted palm at the rear of the ballroom. From there, he listens to Blalock give credit to the other doctors who assisted in the work yet makes no mention of Thomas or his contributions. The next day, Thomas reveals that he saw the ceremony, and quits Blalock's lab. Thomas's heart is with the lifesaving work he left behind and he finds himself unhappy in other endeavors. He therefore decides to overlook Blalock's failure to properly acknowledge his contributions and returns to his lab.

In 1964, one day before Blalock's death, he sees Thomas, now a professional instructor of surgeons in the open heart surgery wing. After Blalock's death, Thomas continued his work at Johns Hopkins training surgeons. In a formal ceremony in 1976, Johns Hopkins belatedly recognized the importance of Thomas's work and awarded him an honorary doctorate. A portrait of Thomas was placed on a wall at Johns Hopkins next to Blalock's portrait, which had been placed there years earlier. Later, after looking at the portraits, Thomas walks away when the hospital intercom pages him. A shot of the portraits made for the film—based on the actors who played Blalock and Thomas—dissolves to a shot of the portraits at Johns Hopkins. The film concludes with a title card revealing that Blalock and Thomas's work launched the field of cardiac surgery, and that doctors in the United States now perform over 1.75 million heart operations per year.

== Cast ==
- Alan Rickman as Dr. Alfred Blalock
- Mos Def as Dr. Vivien Thomas
- Kyra Sedgwick as Mary Blalock
- Gabrielle Union as Clara Thomas
- Charles S. Dutton as William Thomas
- Mary Stuart Masterson as Dr. Helen B. Taussig
- Clayton LeBouef as Harold Thomas
- Merritt Wever as Dorothy Saxon
- John Leslie Wolfe as Dr. Walter Dandy
- Brooke & Kara Gaigler as Eileen Saxon
- Nat Benchley as Karsh
- Robert F. Chew as Janitor

== Production ==
A man who in life avoided the limelight, Vivien Thomas remained virtually unknown outside the circle of Johns Hopkins surgeons he trained. Thomas' story was first brought to public attention by Washingtonian writer Katie McCabe, who learned of his work with Blalock on the day of his death in a 1985 interview with a prominent Washington, D.C. surgeon who described Thomas as "an absolute legend." McCabe's 1989 magazine article on Thomas, "Like Something the Lord Made", generated widespread interest in the story and inspired the making of a 2003 public television documentary on Thomas and Alfred Blalock, Partners of the Heart. A Washington, D.C. dentist, Irving Sorkin, discovered McCabe's article and brought it to Hollywood, where it was developed into the film.

The film was shot in part in the historic Warfield Complex, Hubner, and T Buildings of the Springfield Hospital Center in Sykesville, Maryland. It was also partially shot on location on the East Homewood and Homewood campuses of Johns Hopkins University.

== Awards and nominations ==
Year	Award	Category	Nominee(s)	Result	Ref.
2004	Artios Awards	Best Casting – TV Movie of the Week	Lynn Kressel & Pat Moran	Won	
2004	Online Film & Television Association Awards	Best Motion Picture Made for Television		Nominated	
2004	Online Film & Television Association Awards	Best Actor in a Motion Picture or Miniseries	Mos Def	Nominated	
2004	Online Film & Television Association Awards	Best Actor in a Motion Picture or Miniseries	Alan Rickman	Nominated	
2004	Online Film & Television Association Awards	Best Costume Design in a Motion Picture or Miniseries		Nominated	
2004	Online Film & Television Association Awards	Best Editing in a Motion Picture or Miniseries		Nominated	
2004	Online Film & Television Association Awards	Best Lighting in a Motion Picture or Miniseries		Nominated	
2004	Online Film & Television Association Awards	Best Music in a Motion Picture or Miniseries		Won	
2004	Online Film & Television Association Awards	Best Production Design in a Motion Picture or Miniseries		Nominated	
2004	Primetime Emmy Awards	Outstanding Made for Television Movie	Robert W. Cort, David Madden, Eric Hetzel, Michael Drake & Julian Krainin	Won	
2004	Primetime Emmy Awards	Outstanding Lead Actor in a Miniseries or a Movie	Mos Def	Nominated	
2004	Primetime Emmy Awards	Outstanding Lead Actor in a Miniseries or a Movie	Alan Rickman	Nominated	
2004	Primetime Emmy Awards	Outstanding Directing for a Miniseries, Movie or a Dramatic Special	Joseph Sargent	Nominated	
2004	Primetime Emmy Awards	Outstanding Writing for a Miniseries, Movie or a Dramatic Special	Peter Silverman &Robert Caswell	Nominated	
2004	Primetime Emmy Awards	Outstanding Casting for a Miniseries, Movie or a Special	Lynn Kressel & Pat Moran	Nominated	
2004	Primetime Emmy Awards	Outstanding Cinematography for a Miniseries or Movie	Donald M. Morgan	Won	
2004	Primetime Emmy Awards	Outstanding Single-Camera Picture Editing for a Miniseries, Movie or a Special	Michael Brown	Won	
2004	Primetime Emmy Awards	Outstanding Single-Camera Sound Mixing for a Miniseries or a Movie	Rick Ash, Adam Jenkins & Bruce Litecky	Nominated	
2005	American Cinema Editors Awards	Best Edited Miniseries or Motion Picture for Non-Commercial Television	Michael Brown	Won	
2005	American Film Institute Awards	Top 10 Television Programs		Won	
2005	BET Awards	Best Actress	Gabrielle Union	Nominated	
2005	Black Reel Awards	Outstanding TV Movie or Mini-Series	Robert W. Cort & Eric Hetzel	Won	
2005	Black Reel Awards	Outstanding Director, TV Movie or Mini-Series	Joseph Sargent	Nominated	
2005	Black Reel Awards	Outstanding Actor, TV Movie or Mini-Series	Mos Def	Nominated	
2005	Black Reel Awards	Outstanding Supporting Actor, TV Movie or Mini-Series	Clayton LeBouef	Won	
2005	Black Reel Awards	Outstanding Supporting Actress, TV Movie or Mini-Series	Gabrielle Union	Nominated	
2005	Cinema Audio Society Awards	Outstanding Achievement in Sound Mixing for Television Movies and Mini-Series	Bruce Litecky, Rick Ash & Adam Jenkins	Nominated	
2005	Critics' Choice Awards	Best Picture Made for Television		Nominated	
2005	Directors Guild of America Awards	Outstanding Directorial Achievement in Movies for Television or Miniseries	Joseph Sargent	Won	
2005	Golden Globe Awards	Best Miniseries or Television Film		Nominated	
2005	Golden Globe Awards	Best Actor – Miniseries or Motion Picture Made for Television	Mos Def	Nominated	
2005	NAACP Image Awards	Outstanding Television Movie, Mini-Series or Dramatic Special		Won	
2005	NAACP Image Awards	Outstanding Actor in a Television Movie, Mini-Series or Dramatic Special	Mos Def	Nominated	
2005	NAACP Image Awards	Outstanding Actress in a Television Movie, Mini-Series or Dramatic Special	Gabrielle Union	Nominated	
2005	NAMIC Vision Awards	Best Drama		Nominated	
2005	NAMIC Vision Awards	Best Dramatic Performance	Mos Def	Nominated	
2005	Peabody Awards		Cort/Madden Productions in association with HBO Films	Won	
2005	Producers Guild of America Awards	David L. Wolper Award for Outstanding Producer of Long-Form Television	Robert W. Cort, David Madden, Mike Drake & Eric Hetzel	Nominated	
2005	Satellite Awards	Best Motion Picture Made for Television		Nominated	
2005	Satellite Awards	Best Actor in a Miniseries or Motion Picture Made for Television	Mos Def	Nominated	
2005	Satellite Awards	Best Actor in a Miniseries or Motion Picture Made for Television	Alan Rickman	Nominated	
2005	Satellite Awards	Best Actress in a Supporting Role in a Series, Miniseries or Motion Picture Made for Television	Mary Stuart Masterson	Nominated	
2005	Television Critics Association Awards	Outstanding Achievement in Movies, Miniseries and Specials		Nominated	
2005	Writers Guild of America Awards	Long Form – Original	Peter Silverman & Robert Caswell	Won	

== See also ==
- Eileen Saxon
