= Rowena Spencer =

American physician

Rowena Spencer (July 3, 1922 – May 13, 2014) was an American physician who specialized in pediatric surgery at a time when it was unusual for a female to become a surgeon. She was the first female surgical intern at the Johns Hopkins Hospital, the first female appointed to the full-time surgery staff at Louisiana State University, and the first female surgeon in Louisiana.

== Medical career ==
Spencer was one of four women in her medical school class at Johns Hopkins (1943–1947), the first woman intern in surgery at the Johns Hopkins Hospital working under Alfred Blalock (1947–1948), the first woman to train in pediatric surgery at the Children's Hospital of Philadelphia working under C. Everett Koop (1948–1949), the first woman to complete a surgery residency at Charity Hospital in New Orleans (1953), and the first woman to join the surgery faculty at Louisiana State University in New Orleans (1953). Spencer practiced at Tulane University Hospital from 1968 to 1977, after which she maintained a private practice until her retirement in 1984. She was known to be very devoted to the babies whom she cared for, often sleeping at the hospital in order to monitor her patients' condition after surgery.

== Conjoined twins ==
Her bibliography includes 15 publications on conjoined twins, an interest that dated from her work with C. Everett Koop at Children's Hospital of Philadelphia and her own experience at Charity Hospital, where she separated four sets of twins. She also aided in separating four sets of conjoined twins. Howard Mahoner, a noted vascular surgeon affiliated with Louisiana State University and president of the American College of Surgeons in 1970–1971, collaborated with Spencer to devise a bypass operation for arterial aneurysm using arterial homografts. In 1990 Spencer began to do research on conjoined twins, and became one of the world's leading authorities on the subject. Dr Jeong-Wook Seo and she studied together to study on the symmetry of coinoined twins as a mechanism of "fusion or fission" of twins. She later published a book on the topic, entitled Conjoined Twins: Developmental Malformations and Clinical Implications.

== Recognition and legacy ==
In 1999, Spencer was honored by Johns Hopkins University Alumni Association with the Distinguished Alumnus Award.
