= Eileen Saxon =

Sufferer of blue baby syndrome

Eileen Saxon, sometimes referred to as "The Blue Baby", was the first patient that received the operation now known as Blalock–Thomas–Taussig shunt.

She had a condition called tetralogy of Fallot, one of the primary congenital defects that lead to blue baby syndrome. In this condition, defects in the great vessels and wall of the heart lead to a chronic lack of oxygen in the blood. In Eileen's case, this made her lips and fingers turn blue, with the rest of her skin having a very faint blue tinge. She could only take a few steps before beginning to breathe heavily.

On November 29, 1944, Saxon was the first living human to receive a groundbreaking operation (now known as a Blalock-Thomas-Taussig shunt) suggested by pediatric cardiologist Helen B. Taussig and administered by Alfred Blalock, with Vivien Thomas, who had perfected the surgery in laboratory tests on animals, standing over his shoulder to advise him on performing the surgery.

The surgery had been designed and first performed on laboratory dogs by Thomas, who taught the technique to Blalock. Although Thomas perfected the technique, he could not perform the surgery because he was not a doctor.

The surgery was not completely successful, since Eileen Saxon became cyanotic again a few months later. Another shunt was attempted on the opposite side of the chest, but she died a few days afterwards, very close to her second birthday. Though Saxon died, she lived long enough to demonstrate that the operation would work. The team later discovered the operation worked best in older children. Saxon herself could not have waited any longer; her situation had become critical by the time of her first surgery.

Eileen Saxon's surgery was re-enacted in the documentary Partners of the Heart, produced by Spark Media, and broadcast on American Experience in 2003.

The 2004 movie produced by HBO, Something The Lord Made, is a dramatic feature based on the Saxon baby operation.
