= Helen B. Taussig =

American cardiologist (1898–1986)

Helen Brooke Taussig
- Born: May 24, 1898; Cambridge, Massachusetts, U.S.
- Died: 20 May 1986 (aged 87); Kennett Square, Pennsylvania, U.S.
- Education: University of California, Berkeley; Johns Hopkins School of Medicine
- Known for: Founding figure of paediatric cardiology Blalock-Thomas-Taussig shunt Role in banning of thalidomide
- Awards: E. Mead Johnson Award (1947); Lasker-DeBakey Clinical Medical Research Award (1954); Presidential Medal of Freedom (1964); Elizabeth Blackwell Award (1970); John Howland Award (1971)
- Scientific career
- Fields: Cardiology
- Notable students: S. I. Padmavati

Helen Brooke Taussig (May 24, 1898 – May 20, 1986) was an American cardiologist, working in Baltimore and Boston, who founded the field of pediatric cardiology. She is credited with developing the concept for a procedure that would extend the lives of children born with Tetralogy of Fallot (the most common cause of blue baby syndrome). This concept was applied in practice as a procedure known as the Blalock-Thomas-Taussig shunt. The procedure was developed by Alfred Blalock and Vivien Thomas, who were Taussig's colleagues at the Johns Hopkins Hospital.

Taussig was partially deaf following an ear infection in childhood; in early adulthood this progressed to full deafness. To compensate for her loss of hearing, she learned to use lip-reading techniques and hearing aids to speak with her patients. Taussig also developed a method of using her fingers, rather than a stethoscope, to feel the rhythm of their heartbeats. Some of her innovations have been attributed to her ability to diagnose heart problems by touch rather than by sound.

Taussig is also known for her work in banning thalidomide and was widely recognized as a highly skilled physician. She was the first woman to be elected head of the American Heart Association. In 1964, she was awarded a Presidential Medal of Freedom.

== Early life and education ==
Helen Brooke Taussig was born in Cambridge, Massachusetts, on May 24, 1898, to F. W. Taussig and Edith Thomas Guild, the youngest of four children. Her father was an economist at Harvard University, and her mother was one of the first students at Radcliffe College, a women's college.

She spent summers as a child in Cotuit, Massachusetts, and later in life had a home there.

When Taussig was 11 years old, her mother died of tuberculosis. Helen also contracted the disease and was ill for several years, severely affecting her ability to do schoolwork. She also struggled with severe dyslexia through her early school years and was partially deaf. Despite this, she did well at school due to diligent work and extensive tutoring from her father.

She graduated from Cambridge School for Girls in 1917, then studied for two years at Radcliffe College before earning a bachelor's degree and Phi Beta Kappa membership from the University of California, Berkeley in 1921.

After graduating, Taussig wished to study at Harvard Medical School, but the medical program did not accept women (this was the case until 1945, though the first woman had applied nearly 100 years earlier, in 1847); the program accepted women in theory but would not grant them a degree. Instead she considered applying to study public health, partially because her father thought it a more suitable field for women,

Taussig ended up taking classes at Boston University in histology, bacteriology, and anatomy, without expecting to receive a degree. She was required to sit at the rear of the lecture hall apart from the male students and not speak to them. As an anatomy student at Boston University in 1925, she published her first scientific paper on studies of ox heart muscles with her professor Alexander Begg.

With Begg's encouragement, Taussig applied to transfer to the Johns Hopkins University School of Medicine, one of the few medical schools to admit women at the time, and was accepted as a full-degree candidate. She wanted to specialise in internal medicine, but the one position available for a woman in that specialization was already taken so she opted for pediatrics and the emerging field of pediatric cardiology. After attaining her Doctorate of Medicine in 1927, Taussig remained at Johns Hopkins as a cardiology fellow for one year and two years as a pediatrics intern and received two Archibald Fellowships.

== Blalock-Thomas-Taussig shunt ==
=== Concept ===
Taussig's early career in pediatric cardiology at Johns Hopkins consisted of studying babies with congenital heart defects and rheumatic fever, an inflammation of the heart and other organs resulting from bacterial infection, which was at the time a major source of child mortality. In the early 20th century, rheumatic heart disease made up the majority of clinical cardiology work: congenital heart defects were considered hopeless curiosities as the surgical means to correct them were extremely undeveloped so relatively little could be done to prevent the early deaths of patients with these conditions.

She then was hired by the pediatric department of Johns Hopkins, the Harriet Lane Home, as its chief, where she served from 1930 until 1963. Taussig made use of fluoroscopy as a diagnostic tool, and developed a particular interest in infants with cyanosis (blue-tinged appearance), often caused by the heart defect Tetralogy of Fallot. Cyanosis is caused when insufficient oxygenated blood is circulating around the body; in infants it can be known as "blue baby syndrome". Taussig is most remembered for her role in the development of a surgical treatment for this condition, the Blalock-Thomas-Taussig shunt.

A new surgery first performed in 1939 by Robert Gross corrected a common pediatric heart problem: patent ductus arteriosus. The ductus arteriosus is a small blood vessel connecting the pulmonary artery to the aorta of a foetus. Since the foetus obtains oxygen via the mother's placenta and not via its own lungs, which are fluid-filled and not yet functional, this vessel provides a shortcut, bypassing the lungs and allowing more efficient delivery of oxygenated blood around the foetus' body. In most infants, the ductus arteriosus closes within a few weeks of birth so that blood flows to the lungs to be oxygenated; if it remains open or 'patent', the normal flow of blood is disrupted. This new surgical procedure artificially closed the blood vessel.

While this was going on, Taussig observed that infants with cyanotic heart defects such as Tetralogy of Fallot or pulmonary atresia often fared remarkably better if they also had a patent ductus arteriosus, with less severe symptoms and longer survival. In general, cyanotic symptoms would often begin or worsen shortly after birth, a change which Taussig suspected was caused by the natural closure of the ductus arteriosus. In cyanotic children, bloodflow from the heart to the lungs via the pulmonary artery is often compromised; Taussig thought that surgically creating an artificial ductus linking these two vessels could increase bloodflow to the lungs and alleviate this problem, increasing survival. She broached the idea to Robert Gross, and he was skeptical, reportedly telling her "I have enough trouble closing the ductus arteriosus. I certainly don't want to try to make an artificial one."

=== The first surgeries ===
Two years later, Taussig obtained the collaboration of Johns Hopkins' new chief of surgery Alfred Blalock and his laboratory assistant Vivien Thomas. The three of them developed a surgery now known as the Blalock-Thomas-Taussig shunt. Originally, it was referred to as the Blalock-Taussig shunt: the critical input of Vivien Thomas was overlooked because of his non-clinical role and because of his race.

Following extensive experimentation on about 200 dogs, on November 9, 1944, Blalock and Thomas performed the surgery on the first human patient. Eileen Saxon, a 15-month-old baby, had arrived at the emergency department earlier that month severely underweight at just 5 kg, purplish blue in colour and hardly able to drink a sip without gasping for breath. Taussig diagnosed her with Tetralogy of Fallot, a diagnosis which meant that without intervention she certainly would not survive to adulthood. The procedure was an immediate success: Eileen's colour quickly returned to normal, she could drink milk more easily and gained a few kilograms. Two months after the surgery she was discharged from hospital. However, she became cyanotic again a few months later and died shortly before her second birthday. Despite Eileen's death, the operation was proof that the Blalock-Thomas-Taussig shunt could in principle be used to extend the lives of children with cyanotic heart disease.

By 1945, this operation had been performed on a total of three infants with pulmonary stenosis and pulmonary atresia. As Alfred Blalock and Helen Taussig wrote in Journal of the American Medical Association, "Heretofore there has been no satisfactory treatment for pulmonary stenosis and pulmonary atresia. A "blue" baby with a malformed heart was considered beyond the reach of surgical aid. During the past three months we have operated on 3 children with severe degrees of pulmonary stenosis and each of the patients appears to be greatly benefited. In the second and third cases, in which there was deep persistent cyanosis, the cyanosis has greatly diminished or has disappeared and the general condition of the patients is proportionally improved." Following this report, and lectures given by Blalock and Taussig at conferences around Europe and America, the procedure quickly gained worldwide acceptance.

=== Legacy ===
With the international fame this surgery drew, parents worldwide began coming to Baltimore to have their "blue babies" treated by Blalock and Taussig. The rapid influx of prospective patients was so great that the clinic struggled to cope, and medical visitors from around the world came to assist and to share knowledge. By 1951, the team had operated on over 1,000 children and the surgery had a mortality rate of only 5%.

One of the major benefits of this surgery was that children gained the ability to play actively without the rapid exhaustion and frequent loss of consciousness that usually results from cyanotic heart defects. Helen Taussig reportedly kept a letter on her mantelpiece from twelve year old Jean-Pierre Cablan, written after undergoing the procedure: "Je suis maintenant un tout autre petit garcon ... je vais pouvoir aller jouer avec mes petits camarades." ("I am now a completely new boy... I will be able to play with the other children.") Often, an immediate improvement in the level of cyanosis could be seen as well. Taussig later recalled, "I suppose nothing would ever give me as much delight as seeing the first patient change from blue to pink in the operating room... bright pink cheeks and bright lips."

Nowadays, the Blalock-Thomas-Taussig shunt is useful for prolonging life and improving health in infants before heart defects can be definitively repaired, commonly as the first stage of the three-step Norwood Procedure. It allows infants to survive and gain weight before more complex surgeries are later attempted, and is used in the care of patients with Tetralogy of Fallot, pulmonary atresia, and more rare and complex abnormalities.

At the time of Taussig's death, tens of thousands of children's lives had been saved by the shunt procedure.

== Further career ==
As a physician, Taussig pioneered the use of x-rays and fluoroscopy simultaneously to examine changes in a baby's heart and lungs in a less invasive manner, and was very skilled in diagnosing heart conditions by feeling the heartbeat with her fingertips, rather than listening with a stethoscope.

As well as her day to day clinical work as a paediatrician, Taussig was also an accomplished academic clinician. She published 100 academic articles over her career, considering various aspects of cardiology including biomedical ethics and the evolutionary origins of heart disease. In her research into the long-term outcomes of recipients of the shunt, Taussig remained in touch with many of her patients as they grew to adulthood and middle age.

In 1947, after a decade of gathering material, Taussig published her magnum opus, Congenital Malformations of the Heart, considered to be the foundational text of pediatric cardiology as an independent field. The book was expanded into two volumes for a second edition published in 1960.

Taussig later became an associate professor at the Johns Hopkins School of Medicine; she was promoted to full professor in 1959. At the time, she was only the second woman to reach full professor status at the university. She continued to serve as the director of the Harriet Lane Home (the children's treatment and research centre at Johns Hopkins) until her retirement in 1963. Most paediatric clinics at the time focussed on rheumatic fever, which was the major source of child mortality, but because of Taussig's experience, the Harriet Lane Home was also able to provide specialist care for children with congenital heart disease. It became a world-leading centre that aspiring surgeons flocked to.

Together with the cardiologist Richard Bing, Taussig was in 1949 the first to describe a heart condition now known as Taussig-Bing syndrome. This is the second most common type of double-outlet right ventricle (DORV), a set of rare congenital heart conditions in which the aorta, which is supposed to carry oxygen-rich blood from the left ventricle of the heart, instead is connected to the right ventricle and supplies oxygen-poor blood to the body. Several alternative methods for surgically correcting this defect have been tried over the decades since the problem was first described, and survival rates following surgical intervention are greatly improved in recent decades.

=== Banning of thalidomide ===
Around 1960, many more babies than usual began to be born in Germany, Belgium and the Netherlands with phocomelia, a previously very rare condition in which limbs are absent or small and abnormally formed. The German paediatrician Widukind Lenz was the first to draw a link to the increasing frequency of this condition and thalidomide, a drug which was a popular sleeping medication at the time with the trade name Softenon, and was often taken by pregnant women to counter morning sickness. However, when it is taken between days 35 and 49 of a pregnancy, it blocks normal limb development and causes phocomelia.

After hearing about this issue from one of her students in January 1962, Taussig travelled to Germany and examined some of these children for herself. She reached the same conclusion as Lenz: that thalidomide taken during pregnancy was causing phocomelia. She flew back to America and launched a campaign to try to stop the pending approval of thalidomide by the FDA, speaking at the American College of Physicians, writing in journals and magazines, and testifying before Congress in 1967. Her and others' efforts paid off: the drug was banned in the United States and Europe.

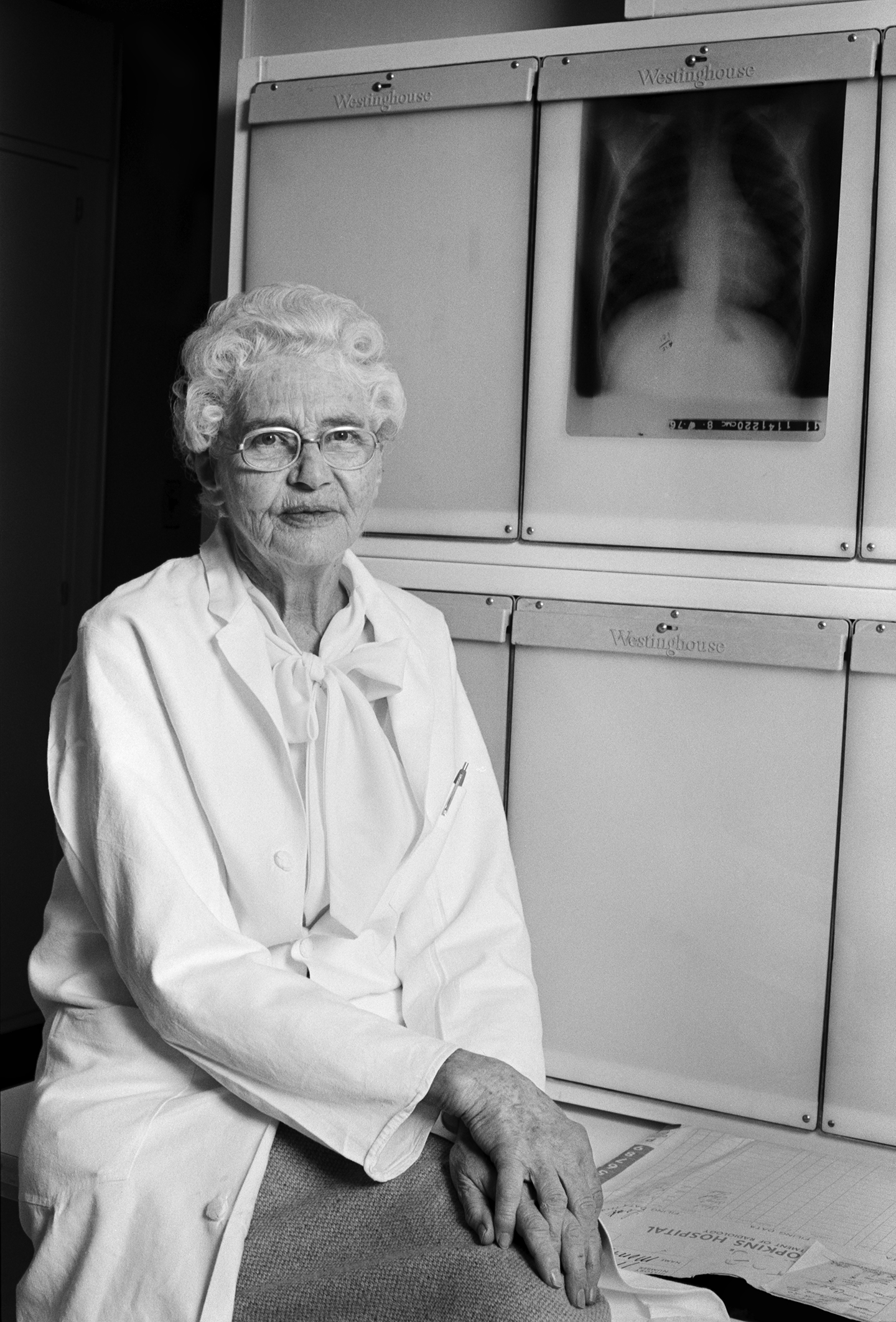
Helen B. Taussig photographed in New York City 1978 by Lynn Gilbert

== Retirement and death ==
Taussig formally retired from Johns Hopkins in 1963, but continued to teach, give lectures, and lobby for various causes. In addition, she kept writing scientific papers (of the 129 total that Taussig wrote, 41 were after her retirement from Johns Hopkins). She advocated for the use of animals in medical research and for legalized abortion, as well as the benefits of palliative care and hospice.

In 1977, Taussig moved to a retirement community in Kennett Square, Pennsylvania. Ever active, she continued making periodic trips to the University of Delaware for research work. At the time of her death, she was researching the genetic basis for congenital heart defects in birds.

On May 20, 1986, four days short of her 88th birthday, Taussig was driving a group of friends to vote in a local election when her car collided with another vehicle at an intersection. She died about an hour later at Chester County Hospital, and donated her body to Johns Hopkins.

== Honors ==
- 1947: Chevalier (knight) of the Legion d'Honneur
- 1948: Passano Foundation Award for an outstanding contribution to medical science, shared with Alfred Blalock- the first time this award was shared, and the first time it was awarded to a woman
- 1953: Honorary medal from the American College of Chest Physicians
- 1954: Feltrinelli Award
- 1954: Albert Lasker Award for Outstanding Contributions to Medicine
- 1957: Fellow of the American Academy of Arts and Sciences
- 1957: Eleanor Roosevelt Achievement Award
- 1960: Honorary fellow of the American College of Cardiology
- 1963: Gold Heart Award
- 1963: Achievement Award from the American Association of University Women
- 1964: Presidential Medal of Freedom awarded by President Lyndon Johnson
- 1965: The University of Göttingen named its cardiac clinic in honor of Taussig
- 1965: First woman and first pediatrician to be elected president of the American Heart Association
- 1970: Blackwell Award from Hobart and William Smith Colleges
- 1971: Howland Award from the American Pediatric Society
- 1973: Elected to the National Academy of Sciences, 27 years after Blalock was elected for their joint work on the Blalock-Taussig shunt
- 1973: Elected to the American Philosophical Society
- 1973: Inducted into the National Women's Hall of Fame
- 1976: Awarded the Milton S. Eisenhower Medal for Distinguished Service by Johns Hopkins
- 1982: Elizabeth Blackwell Medal awarded by the American Medical Women's Association
- 2005: Johns Hopkins School of Medicine named one of its four colleges in her honor, as well as the Helen B. Taussig Congenital Heart Disease Center
- 2018: The Helen B. Taussig Research Award began to be given out to postdoctoral fellows holding appointments in the Basic Sciences and clinical Departments at the Johns Hopkins School of Medicine

Throughout her career, Taussig earned more than 20 honorary degrees. Taussig was a member of several professional societies during her career. She was a member of the American Pediatric Society, the Society for Pediatric Research, and the American College of Physicians.

== Film portrayals ==
In the 2004 HBO movie Something the Lord Made about the life of Vivien Thomas, Dr. Taussig was portrayed by Mary Stuart Masterson. The movie was nominated for many awards and won several.
