= Vivien Thomas =

American laboratory supervisor (1910–1985)

Dr. Vivien Thomas
- Thomas' 1969 portrait by Bob Gee.
- Born: Vivien Theodore Thomas; August 29, 1910; Lake Providence, Louisiana, US
- Died: November 26, 1985 (aged 75); Baltimore, Maryland, US
- Education: Pearl High School
- Years active: 1930–1979
- Medical career
- Profession: Instructor of Surgery
- Institutions: Johns Hopkins Hospital, Vanderbilt University Hospital
- Research: Blue baby syndrome, Atrial septostomy

Vivien Theodore Thomas (August 29, 1910 – November 26, 1985) was an American laboratory supervisor who, in the 1940s, played a major role in developing a procedure now called the Blalock–Thomas–Taussig shunt used to treat blue baby syndrome (now known as cyanotic heart disease) along with surgeon Alfred Blalock and cardiologist Helen B. Taussig. He was the assistant to Blalock in Blalock's experimental animal laboratory at Vanderbilt University in Nashville, Tennessee, and later at Johns Hopkins University in Baltimore, Maryland. Thomas was unique in that he did not have any professional education or experience in a research laboratory; however, he served as supervisor of the surgical laboratories at Johns Hopkins for 35 years. In 1976, Johns Hopkins awarded him an honorary doctorate and named him an Instructor of Surgery for the Johns Hopkins School of Medicine. Without any education past high school, Thomas rose above poverty to become a cardiac surgery pioneer and a teacher of operative techniques to many of the country's most prominent surgeons.

A PBS documentary, Partners of the Heart, was broadcast in 2003 on PBS's American Experience. In the 2004 HBO movie Something the Lord Made, based on Katie McCabe's National Magazine Award–winning Washingtonian article with a similar but longer title, Vivien Thomas was portrayed by Yasiin Bey.

== Background ==
Vivien Thomas writes in his autobiography, published shortly after his death, that he was born in Lake Providence, Louisiana, in 1910. Thomas was born during the Jim Crow era, to Willard Maceo Thomas and the former Mary Alice Eaton. There are noted discrepancies in references to Thomas' birthplace due to his listing New Iberia as his birthplace on his World War II draft card, and when he died in 1985, his obituary in The Baltimore Sun also listed New Iberia. New Iberia was his mother's hometown, Lake Providence his father's. Either way, the family did not stay in Louisiana for long, moving to Nashville, Tennessee, when Thomas was about two years old.

Thomas attended Pearl High School in Nashville in the 1920s, and graduated in 1929. Thomas' father was a carpenter, and took pleasure in passing down his expertise to his sons. Thomas worked with his father and brothers every day after school and on Saturdays, doing jobs such as measuring, sawing, and nailing. This experience proved beneficial to Thomas, as he was able to secure a carpentry job at Fisk University repairing facility damages after graduating from high school. Thomas had hoped to attend college and become a doctor, but the Great Depression derailed his plans. Thomas intended to work hard, save money, and gain a higher education as soon as he could afford it. Determined to broaden his skill set, in 1930 he reached out to childhood friend Charles Manlove (who was working at Vanderbilt University at the time) to ask if there were any jobs available.

== Career ==
In the wake of the stock market crash in October 1929, Thomas put his educational plans on hold and, through a friend, secured a job in February 1930 as a surgical research assistant with Dr. Alfred Blalock at Vanderbilt University. On his first day of work, Thomas assisted Blalock with a surgical experiment on a dog. At the end of Thomas' first day, Blalock told Thomas they would do another experiment the next morning. Blalock told Thomas to "come in and put the animal to sleep and get it set up." Within a few weeks, Thomas was starting surgery on his own. Thomas was classified and paid as a janitor, despite the fact that by the mid-1930s, he was doing the work of a postdoctoral researcher in the lab.

Thomas struggled with finances despite saving most of what he earned. The salaries that he received did not provide enough comfort for him to quit his laboratory research job and go back to school. Nashville's banks failed nine months after Thomas started his job with Blalock, and his savings were wiped out. He abandoned his plans for college and medical school, relieved to have even a low-paying job as the Great Depression deepened. Thomas continued working with Blalock and saving his earnings, so that he could provide for his daughters and wife the best he could.

== Working with Blalock ==
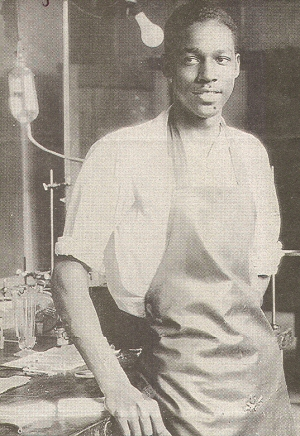
Vivien Thomas in the lab

=== Vanderbilt ===
Thomas and Blalock did groundbreaking research into the causes of hemorrhagic and traumatic shock. This work later evolved into research on crush syndrome and saved the lives of thousands of soldiers on the battlefields of World War II. In hundreds of experiments, the two disproved traditional theories which held that shock was caused by toxins in the blood. Blalock, a highly original scientific thinker and something of an iconoclast, had theorized that shock resulted from fluid loss outside the vascular bed and that the condition could be effectively treated by fluid replacement. Assisted by Thomas, he was able to provide incontrovertible proof of this theory, and in so doing, he gained wide recognition in the medical community by the mid-1930s. At this same time, Blalock and Thomas began experimental work in vascular and cardiac surgery, defying medical taboos against operating on the heart. It was this work that laid the foundation for the revolutionary life-saving surgery they were to perform at Johns Hopkins a decade later. Vivien Thomas spent 11 years at Vanderbilt with Blalock before moving to Johns Hopkins.

=== Johns Hopkins ===
By 1940, the work Blalock had done with Thomas placed Blalock at the forefront of American surgery, and when he was offered the position of Chief of Surgery at his alma mater Johns Hopkins in 1941, he requested that Thomas accompany him. Thomas arrived in Baltimore with his family in June of that year, confronting a severe housing shortage and a level of racism worse than they had endured in Nashville. Johns Hopkins, like the rest of Baltimore, was rigidly segregated, and the only Black employees at the institution were janitors. When Thomas walked the halls in his white lab coat, many heads turned, and he began wearing city clothes when he walked from the laboratory to Blalock's office because he received so much attention. During this time, he lived in the 1200 block of Caroline Street in the community now known as Oliver, Baltimore.

=== Blue baby syndrome ===
Heart presenting a tetralogy of Fallot. A. pulmonic stenosis B. overriding aorta C. ventricular septal defect (VSD) D. right ventricular hypertrophy

In 1943, while pursuing his shock research, Blalock was approached by pediatric cardiologist Helen Taussig, who was seeking a surgical solution to a complex and fatal four-part heart anomaly called tetralogy of Fallot (also known as blue baby syndrome, although other cardiac anomalies produce blueness, or cyanosis). In infants born with this defect, blood is shunted past the lungs, creating oxygen deprivation and a blue pallor. Having treated many such patients in her work at Johns Hopkins' Harriet Lane Home, Taussig was desperate to find a surgical cure. According to the accounts in Thomas' 1985 autobiography and in a 1967 interview with medical historian Peter Olch, Taussig suggested only that it might be possible to "reconnect the pipes" in some way to increase the level of blood flow to the lungs, but did not suggest how this could be accomplished. Blalock and Thomas realized immediately that the answer lay in a procedure they had perfected for a different purpose in their Vanderbilt work, involving the anastomosis (joining) of the subclavian artery to the pulmonary artery, which had the effect of increasing blood flow to the lungs. Thomas was charged with the task of first creating a blue-baby–like condition in a dog and then correcting the condition by means of the pulmonary-to-subclavian anastomosis. Among the dogs on whom Thomas operated was one named Anna, who became the first long-term survivor of the operation and the only animal to have her portrait hung on the walls of Johns Hopkins. In nearly two years of laboratory work involving 200 dogs, Thomas was able to replicate two of the four cardiac anomalies involved in tetralogy of Fallot. He did demonstrate that the corrective procedure was not lethal, thus persuading Blalock that the operation could be safely attempted on a human patient. Blalock was impressed with Thomas' work; when he inspected the procedure performed on Anna, he reportedly said, "This looks like something the Lord made." Even though Thomas knew he was not allowed to operate on patients at that time, he still followed Blalock's rules and assisted him during surgery.

=== Decisive surgery ===
On November 29, 1944, the procedure was first tried on a fifteen-month-old infant named Eileen Saxon. The blue baby syndrome had made her lips and fingers turn blue, with the rest of her skin having a very faint blue tinge. She could take only a few steps before beginning to breathe heavily. Because no instruments for cardiac surgery existed, Thomas adapted the needles and clamps for the procedure from those in use in the animal lab. During the surgery itself, at Blalock's request, Thomas stood on a step stool at Blalock's shoulder and coached him step by step through the procedure. Thomas had performed the operation hundreds of times on a dog, whereas Blalock had done so only once as Thomas' assistant. The surgery was not completely successful, though it did prolong the infant's life for several months. Blalock and his team operated again on an 11-year-old girl, this time with complete success, and the patient was able to leave the hospital three weeks after the surgery. Next, they operated on a six-year-old boy, who dramatically regained his color at the end of the surgery. The three cases formed the basis for the article that was published in the May 1945 issue of the Journal of the American Medical Association, giving credit to Blalock and Taussig for the procedure. Thomas received no mention.

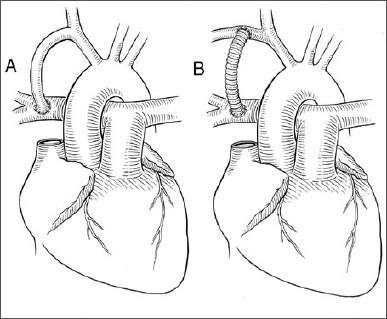
Schematic representation of the Blalock–Thomas–Taussig anastomosis between the right subclavian artery and right pulmonary artery. A / initial anastomosis – B / modified anastomosis.

News of this groundbreaking story was circulated around the world by the Associated Press. Newsreels touted the event, greatly enhancing the status of Johns Hopkins and solidifying the reputation of Blalock, who had been regarded as a maverick up until that point by some in the Johns Hopkins old guard. Thomas' contribution remained unacknowledged, both by Blalock and by Johns Hopkins. Within a year, the operation known as the Blalock–Thomas–Taussig shunt had been performed on more than 200 patients at Johns Hopkins, with parents bringing their suffering children from thousands of miles away.

=== Skills ===
Thomas' surgical techniques included one he developed in 1946 for improving circulation in patients whose great vessels (the aorta and the pulmonary artery) were transposed. A complex operation called an atrial septectomy, the procedure was executed so flawlessly by Thomas that Blalock, upon examining the nearly undetectable suture line, was prompted to remark, "Vivien, this looks like something the Lord made." To the host of young surgeons Thomas trained during the 1940s, he became a figure of legend, the model of a dexterous and efficient cutting surgeon. "Even if you'd never seen surgery before, you could do it because Vivien made it look so simple," the renowned surgeon Denton Cooley told Washingtonian magazine in 1989. "There wasn't a false move, not a wasted motion, when he operated." Surgeons like Cooley, along with Alex Haller, Frank Spencer, Rowena Spencer, and others credited Thomas with teaching them the surgical technique that placed them at the forefront of medicine in the United States. Despite the deep respect Thomas was accorded by these surgeons and by the many Black lab assistants he trained at Hopkins, he was not well paid. He sometimes resorted to working as a bartender, often at Blalock's parties. This led to the peculiar circumstance of his serving drinks to people he had been teaching earlier in the day. Eventually, after negotiations on his behalf by Blalock, he became the highest-paid assistant at Johns Hopkins by 1946, and by far the highest-paid African American on the institution's rolls. Although Thomas never wrote or spoke publicly about his ongoing desire to return to college and obtain a medical degree, his widow, the late Clara Flanders Thomas, revealed in a 1987 interview with Washingtonian writer Katie McCabe that her husband had clung to the possibility of further education throughout the blue baby period and had abandoned the idea only with great reluctance. Mrs. Thomas stated that in 1947 Thomas had investigated the possibility of enrolling in college and pursuing his dream of becoming a doctor but had been deterred by the inflexibility of Morgan State University, which refused to grant him credit for life experience and insisted that he fulfill the standard freshman requirements. Realizing that he would be 50 years old by the time he completed college and medical school, Thomas decided to give up the idea of further education.

=== Relations with Blalock ===
Vivien Thomas felt nervous when he first met Dr. Alfred Blalock because his friend Charles Manlove made it apparent that many people had a hard time working with Blalock. However, Thomas found Blalock to be pleasant, relaxed, and informal during his interview, which provided excitement and comfort. Thomas soon learned that Blalock moved quickly and expected his technicians to be just as efficient. As Blalock performed experiments daily, Thomas observed thoroughly so that he would be able to recreate the steps when Blalock had other responsibilities to attend to. However, there were times when Blalock would lose his temper and use profanity; this often bothered Thomas and threatened their stable working relationship.

During Thomas' time working at Vanderbilt in the lab, he struggled with his salary because he needed to be able to provide for himself, but he also was saving up to go back to school. After many encounters with Blalock about a pay raise and no results, Thomas was going to return to his old job as a carpenter. However, Blalock saw Thomas as a valuable asset and did everything he could to keep Thomas from leaving. Blalock's approach to the issue of Thomas' race was complicated and contradictory throughout their 34-year partnership. Thomas, a laboratory technician, was paid only a janitorial salary. However, white men performing an equivalent of Thomas' job were paid an appreciable dollar more per hour. On the one hand, Blalock defended his choice of Thomas to his superiors at Vanderbilt and to Johns Hopkins colleagues, and he insisted that Thomas accompany him in the operating room during the first series of tetralogy operations. On the other hand, there were limits to his tolerance, especially when it came to issues of pay, academic acknowledgment, and his social interaction outside of work. Tension with Blalock continued to build when he failed to recognize the contributions that Thomas had made in the world-famous blue baby procedure, which led to a rift in their relationship. Thomas was absent from official articles about the procedure, as well as from team pictures that included all of the doctors involved in the procedure.

After Blalock's death from cancer in 1964 at the age of 65, Thomas stayed at Johns Hopkins for 15 more years. In his role as director of Surgical Research Laboratories, he mentored a number of African American lab assistants as well as Hopkins' first Black cardiac resident, Levi Watkins Jr., whom Thomas assisted with his groundbreaking work in the use of the automatic implantable defibrillator.

Thomas' nephew, Koco Eaton, graduated from the Johns Hopkins School of Medicine, trained by many of the physicians his uncle had trained. Eaton trained in orthopedics and, as of 2024, is the team doctor for the Tampa Bay Rays.

=== Institutional acknowledgment ===
In 1968, the surgeons Thomas trained — who had then become chiefs of surgical departments throughout America — commissioned the painting of his portrait (by Bob Gee, oil on canvas, 1969, The Johns Hopkins Alan Mason Chesney Medical Archives) and arranged to have it hung next to Blalock's in the lobby of the Alfred Blalock Clinical Sciences Building.

In 1976, Johns Hopkins University presented Thomas with an honorary doctorate. Due to certain restrictions, he received an honorary Doctor of Laws, rather than a medical doctorate, but it did allow the staff and students of Johns Hopkins Hospital and Johns Hopkins School of Medicine to call him "Doctor". After working there for 37 years, Thomas was also finally appointed to the faculty of the School of Medicine as Instructor of Surgery, although due to his lack of an official medical degree, he was never allowed to operate on a living patient.

In July 2005, Johns Hopkins School of Medicine began the practice of splitting incoming classes of first-year students into four advisory "colleges", each named for famous Hopkins faculty members who had had a major impact on the history of medicine. Thomas was chosen as one of the four, along with Helen Taussig, Florence Sabin, and Daniel Nathans.

In January 2020, Johns Hopkins Children's Center opened a center for collaboration among specialists in pediatric cardiology, pediatric cardiac surgery, and pediatric anesthesiology: the Blalock–Taussig–Thomas Pediatric and Congenital Heart Center.

== Personal life and death ==
In the summer of 1933, Thomas met Clara Beatrice Flanders. Thomas was so fond of Flanders that he married her that same year on December 22, and the newlywed couple moved to Nashville, Tennessee. The couple had two daughters. Olga Fay, the oldest, was born in 1934, and Theodosia Patricia was born 4 years later in 1938.

In 1941, Thomas and his family moved to Baltimore so that he could continue working with Blalock.

In 1971, Thomas was recognized for all his work "behind the scenes" with a ceremony and the presentation of his portrait to the medical institution. Thomas spoke humbly to the full-capacity auditorium. He stated that he lived in humble satisfaction that he was able to help solve some of the world's numerous health problems. He was overjoyed that he was finally getting recognition for his significant role in the research leading to developmental skills that many surgeons had begun to practice.

On July 1, 1976, Thomas was appointed to the faculty as Instructor of Surgery; Thomas served in that capacity for three years and retired in 1979.

A member of the Sharp Street Memorial United Methodist Church, he was named Man of the Year in 1980 by the Madison Avenue Presbyterian Church.

Following his retirement, Thomas began work on an autobiography. He died of pancreatic cancer on November 26, 1985. He was survived by his wife, Clara née Flanders, their two daughters, and three granddaughters. His autobiography, Partners of the Heart, was published just days later.

== Legacy ==
Having learned about Thomas on the day of his death, Washingtonian writer Katie McCabe brought his story to public attention in a 1989 article entitled "Like Something the Lord Made", which won the 1990 National Magazine Award for Feature Writing. This caused various film producers to contact Thomas's surviving family members in search of the film rights to his story. In 2004, Eaton, Thomas's nephew, estimated that he had signed five different deals over the years to allow film companies to tell his uncle's story.

The McCabe article inspired the PBS documentary Partners of the Heart, which was broadcast in 2003 on PBS's American Experience and won the Erik Barnouw Award for Best History Documentary in 2004 from the Organization of American Historians. The McCabe article was also brought to Hollywood through the persistent efforts of Washington, D.C., dentist Irving Sorkin, and formed the basis for the Emmy- and Peabody Award–winning 2004 HBO film Something the Lord Made.

Thomas' legacy as an educator and scientist continued with the institution of the Vivien Thomas Young Investigator Awards, given by the Council on Cardiovascular Surgery and Anesthesiology beginning in 1996. In 1993, the Congressional Black Caucus Foundation instituted the Vivien Thomas Scholarship for Medical Science and Research, sponsored by GlaxoSmithKline. In fall 2004, the Baltimore City Public School System opened the Vivien T. Thomas Medical Arts Academy. In the halls of the school hangs a replica of Thomas' portrait commissioned by his surgeon-trainees in 1969. The Journal of Surgical Case Reports announced in January 2010 that its annual prizes for the best case report written by a doctor and best case report written by a medical student would be named after Thomas.

Vanderbilt University Medical Center created the Vivien T. Thomas Award for Excellence in Clinical Research, recognizing excellence in conducting clinical research.

== See also ==
- Hamilton Naki – Black assistant to heart surgeon Christiaan Barnard
- Daniel Hale Williams

== Bibliography ==
- McCabe, Katie (August 1989). "Like Something the Lord Made". Washingtonian.
  - Reprinted — "Like Something the Lord Made". Atavist. Archived from the original on December 13, 2017 – via Longform Reprints.
  - Reprinted in Jay Friedlander and John Lee (eds.). Feature Writing for Newspapers and Magazines: The Pursuit of Excellence.
  - Revised as "Like Something the Lord Made; The Vivien Thomas Story". Washingtonian. October 29, 2007.
- Thomas, Vivien (1985). Pioneering Research in Surgical Shock and Cardiovascular Surgery: Vivien Thomas and his Work with Alfred Blalock: an Autobiography. Philadelphia: University of Pennsylvania Press. ISBN 978-0-8122-7989-4.
- Thomas, Vivien (1998). Partners of the Heart: Vivien Thomas and His Work with Alfred Blalock (pbk. ed.). University of Pennsylvania Press. ISBN 0-8122-1634-2. (originally published as Pioneering Research in Surgical Shock and Cardiovascular Surgery: Vivien Thomas and His Work with Alfred Blalock).
- (2003) Timmermans Stefan, "A Black Technician and Blue Babies", in Social Studies of Science 33:2 (April 2003), 197–229.
- (2006) Tsung O. Cheng, "Hamilton Naki and Christiaan Barnard Versus Vivien Thomas and Alfred Blalock: Similarities and Dissimilarities", in American Journal of Cardiology 97:3 (February 1, 2006), 435–436.
- (2003). Partners of the Heart. American Experience, PBS.
- (2004) Something the Lord Made, HBO movie, portrayed by Mos Def.
