= C. Rollins Hanlon =

American pioneering cardiac surgeon

Cyril Rollins Hanlon (February 8, 1915 – May 3, 2011) was an American pioneering cardiac surgeon.

== Early life and education ==
Hanlon was born in Baltimore, Maryland. He attended Loyola High School and Loyola College Baltimore, now Loyola University Maryland. He received his MD from Johns Hopkins University where he interned. He did his residency in Cincinnati.

== Career ==
In 1950, he became Chairman of Surgery at St. Louis University. In 1956, while at St. Louis University Hanlon led a 12-person team in performing the first open heart surgery in the state of Missouri or the lower Midwest region of the United States.

He served in the U.S. Navy in the China-Burma-India Theater and aboard the hospital ship Repose. He died after a long battle with lymphoma.
