= Barney Brooks =

American physician and surgeon

Barney Brooks (December 17, 1884 – March 30, 1952) was an American physician and surgeon. He was a medical educator, particularly in surgical residency training, and was known for his research in orthopedics, intestinal obstruction, and vascular surgery. He was appointed first Professor and Chief of Surgery at Vanderbilt University School of Medicine in 1925 where he served until his death in 1952 from a hemorrhagic stroke.

== Training and professional career ==
Barney Brooks was born in Texas in 1884, earned his B.S. from the University of Texas in 1905, and graduated from Johns Hopkins Medical School in 1911. While at Hopkins, he worked for two years as a high school science teacher to supplement the cost. He did his internship in surgery under William Halsted but was not offered an appointment as surgical resident, so he completed his residency at The Barnes Hospital in St. Louis, Missouri, after which he joined the surgical staff at Washington University School of Medicine. In 1925 Brooks was appointed Vanderbilt University School of Medicine’s first Professor and Chief of Surgery, in part due to a strong recommendation from Halsted, despite the fact that Halsted had denied him a residency position years earlier. At both Washington University and Vanderbilt, Brooks established productive laboratories in surgical pathology.

At Vanderbilt, Brooks introduced an Amphitheater Clinic, in which medical students were called down to answer questions about the case being presented, an intense and unforgettable experience for the students.

== Leisure and Health ==
Brooks was an avid golfer who disregarded the limitations of inclement weather. When it was too dark to golf, he was known to play bridge. He suffered from hypertension for many years resulting in complications of congestive heart failure beginning in 1949, a left-sided stroke resulting in right hemiplegia in 1951, and finally a fatal right-sided cerebral hemorrhage in 1952.

== Quotes ==
“...Without doubt the only place for the effective teaching of surgery is on the wards, and good teaching can be done only if the patients are receiving as nearly as possible perfect professional services.” - September 18, 1935, in a letter to Dr. C. W. Flynn
