= Alfred Blalock =

American surgeon (1899–1964)

- Born: April 5, 1899; Culloden, Georgia, U.S
- Died: September 15, 1964 (aged 65); Baltimore, Maryland, U.S.
- Education: University of Georgia; Johns Hopkins School of Medicine
- Spouses: Mary Chambers O'Bryan (1930-1958) (her death); Alice Waters (1959-1964) (his death)
- Children: 3
- Medical career
- Profession: Surgeon
- Institutions: Johns Hopkins Hospital, Vanderbilt University Hospital
- Research: Tetralogy of Fallot, shock
- Awards: Lasker-DeBakey Clinical Medical Research Award (1954); Gairdner Foundation International Award (1959)

Alfred Blalock (April 5, 1899 – September 15, 1964) was an American surgeon most noted for his work on the medical condition of shock as well as tetralogy of Fallot – commonly known as blue baby syndrome. He created, with assistance from his research and laboratory assistant Vivien Thomas and pediatric cardiologist Helen Taussig, the Blalock–Thomas–Taussig shunt, a surgical procedure to relieve the cyanosis from tetralogy of Fallot. This operation ushered in the modern era of neonatal cardiac surgery. He worked at both Vanderbilt University and Johns Hopkins University, where he studied medicine and later served as chief of surgery. He is known as a medical pioneer who won various awards, including Albert Lasker Clinical Medical Research Award. Blalock was also nominated several times for the Nobel Prize in Medicine.

== Early life and education ==
Blalock was born in Culloden, Georgia, the son of Martha "Mattie" (Davis) and George Zadock Blalock, a merchant. At the age of 14, he entered as a senior at Georgia Military College, a preparatory school for the University of Georgia.

Shortly after, Blalock attended the University of Georgia as a sophomore undergraduate, skipping his freshman year. While in college, Blalock was heavily involved in the university social life and athletics. He played tennis and golf, was a member of the Delta chapter of the Sigma Chi fraternity, and was secretary and treasurer of his senior class.

=== Medical education ===
After graduating with an A.B. in 1918 at the age of 19, Blalock entered Johns Hopkins School of Medicine, where he roomed with and began a lifelong friendship with Tinsley Harrison, a student who would go on to specialize in cardiovascular medicine. At Johns Hopkins, his record was not considered "outstanding,” given that he graduated near the middle of his class.” Nevertheless, Blalock excelled in surgical courses while he was a student at Hopkins, and this made him come to the realization that he wanted to be a surgeon. In medical school, Blalock was known by his friends and classmates as a "ladies man" due to his frequent trips to Goucher College, a women's school located nearby.

Blalock earned his medical degree at Johns Hopkins in 1922, hoping to gain appointment to a surgical residency at Johns Hopkins due to his admiration of William S. Halsted. Because of this, Blalock decided to remain in Baltimore for the next three years. However, he was denied a surgical residency with Halsted because of his average academic record. Instead, Blalock decided to complete an internship in urology, in which he performed exceptionally well. He also completed one year of an assistant residency on the general surgical service (his contract was not renewed), and an externship in otorhinolaryngology.

== Vanderbilt University School of Medicine ==
In September 1925, Blalock joined Tinsley Harrison at Vanderbilt University in Nashville to complete his residency under Barney Brooks, Vanderbilt University School of Medicine’s first Professor and Chief of Surgery. During his Vanderbilt years, Blalock spent much of his time in the surgical research laboratory, which he found both challenging and exciting. While at Vanderbilt, Blalock became interested and began studying the nature and treatment of hemorrhagic and traumatic shock. At Vanderbilt, in 1938, Blalock conducted an experiment where the left subclavian artery was connected to the left pulmonary artery. The experiment was meant to induce pulmonary hypertension, but it ended up failing. By conducting his research and mainly experimenting on dogs, Blalock discovered that surgical shock resulted from the loss of blood, which led him to encourage the use of blood plasma or whole blood products to prevent. Blalock's innovative research resulted in the saving of many lives on the battlefield during World War II. Unfortunately, Blalock had frequent bouts of tuberculosis, which developed during his later years at Vanderbilt.

=== Working with Vivien Thomas ===
While working in Vanderbilt in 1930, Blalock became increasingly busy and had several obligations that kept him from spending much time in the laboratory. Because of this, Blalock began searching for a new lab assistant that he would be able to count on to carry out all of his experiments. He ended up hiring Vivien Thomas, a young black carpenter, as his lab assistant. Although Blalock hired Thomas as a lab assistant, he was officially titled a janitor. From Blalock's perspective, Thomas quickly learned how to perform surgical procedures, carry out experiments, and record data for Blalock's research. As they got to know each other, Blalock granted Thomas increased independence in the laboratory, something that was very uncommon, especially for someone black at that time. Blalock and Thomas carried out various experiments relating to shock and cardiac output, as well as developing a technique for adrenal transplantation. Together, they developed innovative, unheard of techniques such as the transplantation of the kidney to the neck in order to remove the kidney's nerve supply and study the effect on “Goldblatt hypertension”. Blalock and Thomas built a strong, though unequal, relationship over the years, somewhat marred toward the end by Blalock's unwillingness to give Thomas full credit for his contribution to their collaboration.

== Johns Hopkins University School of Medicine ==
In 1941 Blalock was asked to return to Johns Hopkins Hospital to work as chief of surgery, professor, and director of the department of surgery of the medical school. When Blalock was offered this position, he immediately requested that his assistant Vivien Thomas come with him. While working together at Hopkins, Blalock and Thomas developed a shunt technique to bypass coarctation of the aorta. Simultaneously, Helen Taussig, a cardiologist, presented to Blalock the problem of the blue baby syndrome - a congenital heart defect known as Tetralogy of Fallot which results in inadequate oxygenation of the blood.

=== The blue baby operation ===
In 1944 Blalock, with Thomas by his side, performed the first "blue baby" operation on Eileen Saxon, a 15-month-old baby. The operation was successful, although the baby died a few months later. After the innovative first completion of the surgery, Blalock became comfortable with the procedure and performed it on thousands of children, often with Thomas by his side. The new operation not only directly saved thousands of lives, it marked the start of the modern era of cardiac surgery, as it was the first successful surgery on the human heart of the modern medical era.

During his later years at Hopkins, Blalock continued his research on the heart and vascular surgery. With Edwards Park, he developed a bypass operation in 1944, and in 1948, with Rollins Hanlon, a cardiac surgeon, he created a technique for overcoming the transposition of the great blood vessels of the heart.

By the 1950s, Blalock had performed over 1,000 surgeries to correct congenital heart defects.

=== Blalock as a mentor ===
In teaching and in research, Blalock paved the way for a new generation of surgeons. Students of Blalock appreciated his unique ability to bring out the best of them. As chief of surgery at Hopkins, Blalock trained 38 chief residents, as well as 9 chairmen of departments, 10 division chiefs, and many others. Many of Blalock's students went on to become cardiovascular surgeons themselves and rose to high levels of importance in the surgical world. His colleague and lifelong friend Tinsley Harrison spoke about Blalock's ability to teach saying, "A teacher is an individual who has the capacity to influence the horizons of his pupils. Al has had that capacity all of his life."

In 1955, Blalock became chairman of the medical board of Johns Hopkins Hospital and held that position until his retirement in 1964. Upon retirement, Blalock held the title of professor and surgeon-in-chief emeritus.

Blalock retired from Hopkins in 1964 due to health problems. His retirement was just two and a half months before his death.

== Personal life and death ==
Blalock married Mary Chambers O'Bryan in October 1930. The two had met while Blalock was at Vanderbilt and she worked for the Vanderbilt admissions office. Together they had three children: William Rice Blalock, Mary Elizabeth Blalock and Alfred Dandy Blalock. Together, they lived a happy marriage for 28 years until her death in 1958. A year later, he married Alice Waters, who was a close neighbor that Blalock had known for many years.

Blalock was known for having an appreciation of sports and the outdoors. He enjoyed playing tennis, golfing, fishing, and boating.

In Blalock's later years he developed several health problems and eventually died in 1964 from metastatic urothelial carcinoma of the ureter.

== Awards and recognition ==
In 1955, Blalock was elected chairman of the medical board of Johns Hopkins Hospital. When he retired in 1964, he was named a Professor Emeritus of Surgery, as well as a Surgeon-in-Chief Emeritus for Johns Hopkins School of Medicine and Johns Hopkins Hospital.

Blalock published more than 200 articles along with a book titled Principles of Surgery, Shock and Other Problems. He also delivered more than 40 honorary lectures, and was awarded honorary degrees from nine universities.

Blalock also belonged to 43 medical societies in the United States and other countries. These included the American Philosophical Society, the National Academy of Sciences and Royal Society of Medicine.

In 1954 Blalock received (with Robert Gross and Helen Taussig) the Albert Lasker Clinical Medical Research Award "For distinguished contributions to cardiovascular surgery and knowledge."

Blalock also received the Chevalier de la Légion d'honneur, the Passano Award, the Matas Award, and the Henry Jacob Bigelow medal.

The Alfred Blalock Clinical Sciences Building at Hopkins Hospital was named after him.

Blalock was also honored with the Baltimore "Man of the Year" award in 1948.

In 2012 a modified Blalock clamp was described by prof. Francesco Petrella (Milan, Italy) for clamping the pulmonary artery during lung cancer resection.

== Films about Blalock and Thomas ==
In 2003, the PBS series American Experience premiered the Spark Media documentary "Partners of the Heart", which was about the collaboration between Blalock and Vivien Thomas at Vanderbilt and Johns Hopkins University. The documentary was directed by Andrea Kalin and written by Kalin and Lou Potter, with re-creations directed by Bill Duke and narration by Morgan Freeman. The "Partners of the Heart" went on to win the Organization of American Historians' Erik Barnouw Award for Best History Documentary in 2004.

In the 2004 HBO film Something the Lord Made about the Blalock-Thomas collaboration, based on Katie McCabe's National Magazine Award winning Washingtonian magazine article of the same name, Blalock was portrayed by Alan Rickman and Thomas by Mos Def. Robert Cort produced the film, which went on to win three Emmy Awards for Outstanding Cinematography for a Miniseries or Movie, Outstanding Single-Camera Picture Editing for a Miniseries, Movie or a Special and Outstanding Made for Television Movie.

Greg Germann portrayed Blalock in the 2019 Netflix variety special Kevin Hart's Guide to Black History a guide to African-American history through re-enactments with a family sitcom set-up and archival footage.
