= Blue baby syndrome =

Two situations that lead to cyanosis in infants

- Other names: Blue baby, cyanotic infant, cyanotic baby, cyanotic newborn
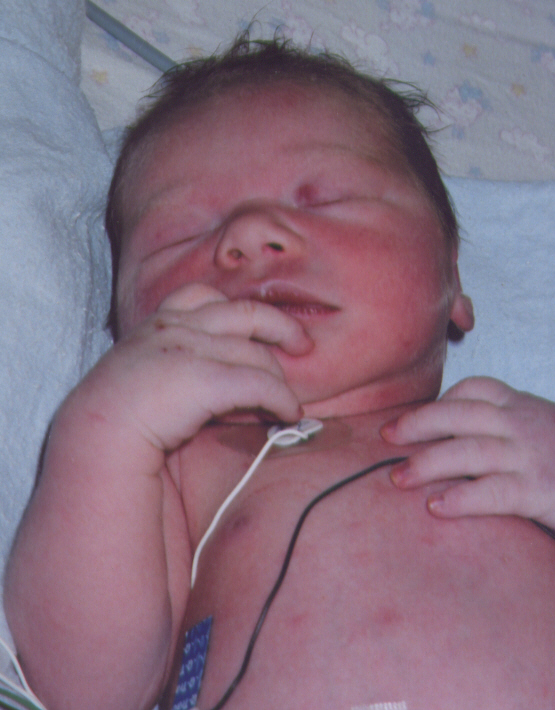
- A cyanotic newborn, or "blue baby". Note the blue coloration of the fingertips.
- Specialty: Pediatrics, cardiac surgery

Blue baby syndrome can refer to conditions that cause cyanosis, or blueness of the skin, in babies as a result of low blood oxygen levels. This term traditionally refers to cyanosis as a result of:

1. Cyanotic heart disease, which is a category of congenital heart defect that lowers blood oxygen levels. It can be caused by reduced blood flow to the lungs or by mixing oxygenated and deoxygenated blood.
2. Methemoglobinemia, which is a disease defined by high levels of methemoglobin in the blood. Increased levels of methemoglobin prevent oxygen from being released into the tissues and result in hypoxemia.

Although these are the most common causes of cyanosis, other potential factors can cause a blue tint to a baby's skin or mucous membranes. These factors include hypoventilation, perfusion or ventilation differences in the lungs, and poor cardiac output of oxygenated blood, among others. The blue baby syndrome or cyanosis occurs when absolute amount of deoxygenated hemoglobin > 3g/dL which is typically reflected with an O_{2} saturation of < 85 %.

Both of these conditions cause cyanosis, or a bluish discoloration of skin or mucous membranes. Normally, oxygenated blood appears red and deoxygenated blood has more of a blue appearance. In babies with low levels of oxygen or mixing of oxygenated and deoxygenated blood, the blood can have a blue or purple color, causing cyanosis.

== Signs and symptoms ==
The main sign of blue baby syndrome is cyanosis. Depending on the underlying cause of the cyanosis, additional symptoms may be:

- Failure to thrive
- Lethargy
- Nasal flaring
- Rapid heartbeat
- Rapid respiratory rate
- Seizures
- Shortness of breath

== Causes ==
Blue baby syndrome has been attributed to cyanotic congenital heart diseases and methemoglobinemia, however there are additional causes that could result in a baby becoming cyanotic, such as:

- Airway obstruction
- Decreased blood perfusion
- Disordered control of breathing (ex: cyanotic breath-holding spells, seizures)
- Pulmonary/lung disorders (ex: pulmonary hypertension, cystic fibrosis)
- Respiratory distress syndrome

== Mechanism ==
=== Cyanotic heart disease ===
Specific types of congenital heart defects cause blood to bypass the lungs by shunting directly from the right side of the heart to the left side, leading to cyanosis. In these defects, deoxygenated blood enters the systemic circulation, giving the skin a bluish color and causing the baby to appear cyanotic. Infants with these types of heart defects may have a persistent bluish tint to their skin, or they may have intermittent episodes of cyanosis. The degree of cyanosis is dependent on the extent of deoxygenated blood mixing with oxygenated blood before being pumped into the systemic circulation.

Cardiac conditions in which there is decreased blood flow to the lungs such as, tetralogy of Fallot or pulmonary valve atresia, result in less blood becoming oxygenated. There are also cardiac conditions such as transposition of the great arteries or truncus arteriosus, that results in an overall increase in blood flow to the lungs but with limited flow of the oxygenated blood to the rest of the body. Conditions in which there is poor blood flow to the systemic circulation, such as coarctation of the aorta suggests that the body does not receive the oxygenated blood it requires with resultant cyanosis.

The five most common cyanotic heart defects that may result in Blue Baby Syndrome include the following:

Pathology	Brief Description	Epidemiology	Diagram
1. Persistent (or patent) truncus arteriosus	Instead of two separate major blood vessels leaving the heart, there is one common outgoing vessel.	3-5/100,000 births	
2. Transposition of the great vessels	The positions of the pulmonary artery and the aorta are switched, with the aorta connecting to the right ventricle and the pulmonary artery connecting to the left ventricle.	1-5/10,000 births	
3. Tricuspid atresia	The heart valve connecting the right atrium to the right ventricle does not form properly, disrupting blood flow in the heart.	1-9/100,000 births	
4. Tetralogy of Fallot	A heart defect with 4 features including a narrow pulmonary artery, a thick right ventricle, an aorta that connects to both the right and left ventricles, and a hole in the ventricular wall.	1-5/10,000 births	
5. Anomalous pulmonary venous connection	The pulmonary veins returning oxygenated blood from the lungs do not connect properly to the heart.	6-12/100,000 births	

=== Methemoglobinemia ===
Hemoglobin oxygenation dissociation curve. In the case of methemoglobinemia the curve is shifted to the left given the higher affinity for oxygen.

Methemoglobinemia can be acquired or congenital. It occurs when the iron in hemoglobin is oxidized from Fe^{2+} to Fe^{3+}, leading to poor binding of oxygen. Additionally, the oxygen that is already bound is held more tightly to the hemoglobin due to a higher affinity, resulting in less oxygen delivery. A methemoglobin level > 1.5 g/dL causes cyanosis. The most common congenital cause is a deficiency in the enzyme cytochrome b5 reductase which reduces methemoglobin in the blood.

However, in infants the most common cause of methemoglobinemia is acquired through the ingestion of nitrates (NO^{−}_{3}) through well water or foods. Nitrites (NO^{−}_{2}) produced by the microbial reduction of nitrate (directly in the drinkwater, or after ingestion by the infant, in his digestive system) are more powerful oxidizers than nitrates and are the chemical agent really responsible of the oxidation of Fe^{2+} into Fe^{3+} in the tetrapyrrole heme of hemoglobin. Infants younger than 4 months are at greater risk given that they drink more water per body weight, they have a lower NADH- cytochrome b5 reductase activity, and they have a higher level of fetal hemoglobin which converts more easily to methemoglobin. Additionally, infants are at an increased risk after an episode of gastroenteritis due to the production of nitrites by bacteria. The sources of nitrate can include fertilizers used in agricultural lands, waste dumps or pit latrines. For example, nitrate levels are subject to monitoring to comply with drinking water quality standards in the United States and other countries. The link between blue baby syndrome and nitrates in drinking water is widely accepted, but as of 2006 some studies indicated that other contaminants or dietary nitrate sources, might also play a role in the syndrome.

== Diagnosis ==
When diagnosing blue baby syndrome, it is important to perform a thorough history and physical exam. When obtaining the history, it is important to determine the timing of symptoms and to ask about risk factors/exposures, such as prenatal history or access to well-water.

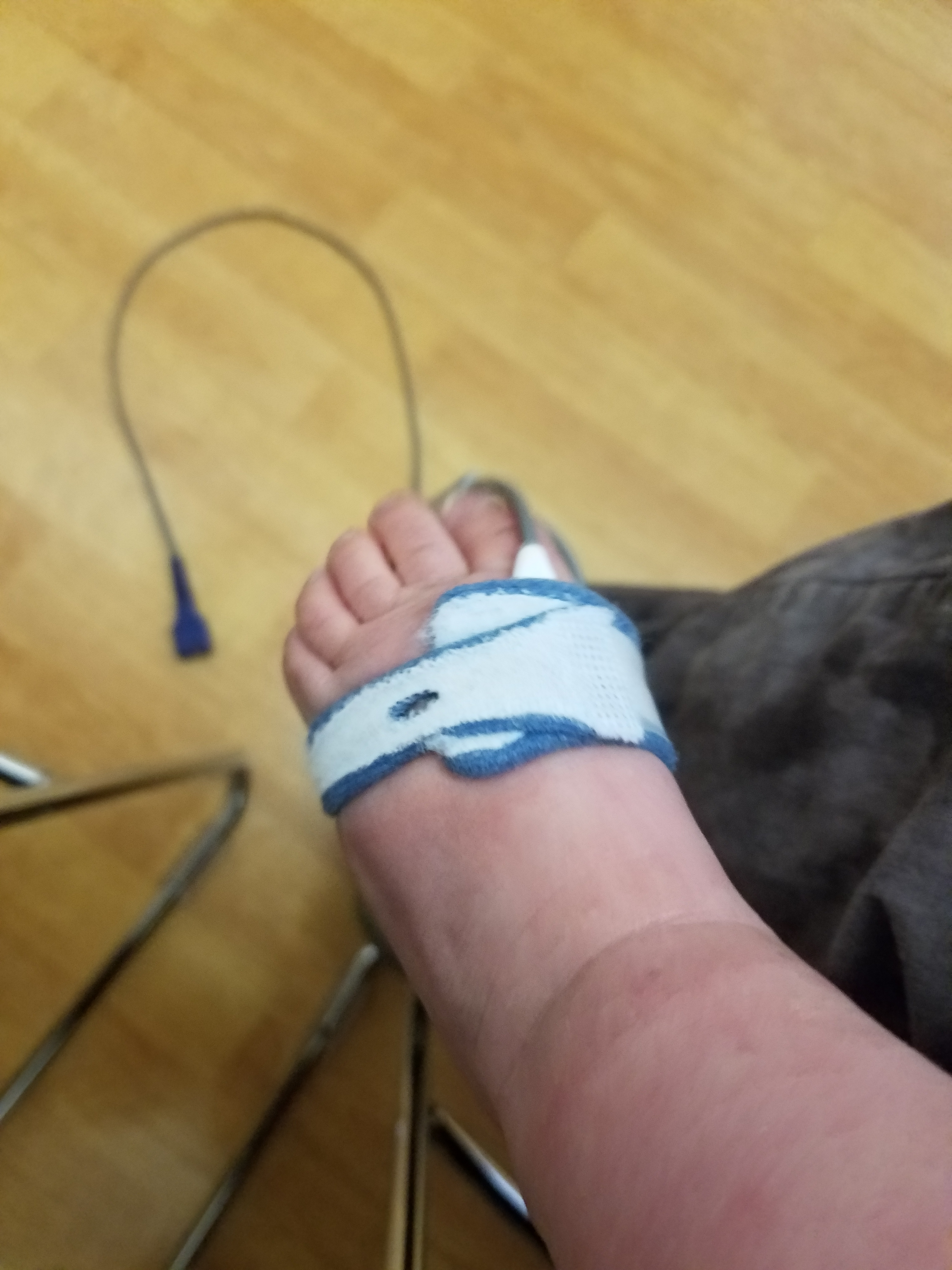
Pulse oximeter on infant's foot.

On physical exam it is important to visualize where the cyanosis is present to differentiate between peripheral and central cyanosis. Central cyanosis is typically visible as a blueish discoloration over the entire body and mucous membranes. In contrast, peripheral cyanosis typically has a blueish discoloration over the extremities. Cyanosis can be noted in babies around the lips, tongue, and sublingual area, where the skin is thinnest. In addition, it is important to observe the infant for signs of respiratory distress, visualized as nasal flaring, subcostal retractions, etc. Examination should include a respiratory and cardiac assessment.

One of the key tools in diagnosing is a pulse oximeter to determine oxygen saturation. While severe cyanosis can be easily noticed, an oxygen saturation as low as 80 % causes only mild clinical cyanosis that is difficult to see. Additionally an arterial blood gas is useful, for example in the case of methemoglobinemia the PO_{2} can be expected to be normal even with a low oxygen saturation. Additional work up includes a complete blood count, blood glucose, blood culture, chest X-ray, and an echocardiography.

Babies with cyanosis due to congenital heart disease usually present with symptoms hours to days after birth. In addition to cyanosis, they often show signs of tachypnea (fast breathing), a heart murmur, and decreased peripheral pulses. If congenital heart disease is suspected in a newborn, doctors will likely perform several tests to evaluate the heart, including a chest x-ray, echocardiogram, and electrocardiogram. In tetralogy of Fallot, episodes in which infants become cyanotic are called tet spells, typically occurring during feeding or crying. When older, children may squat to feel relief since this increases the systemic vascular resistance causing more blood to go towards the lungs, resulting in increased oxygenation.

Babies with cyanosis due to methemoglobinemia also usually present with cyanosis in the neonatal period, but pulse oximetry may be falsely elevated and does not always reveal low blood oxygen saturation. A CO-oximeter can be used to detect levels of methemoglobin in the blood if methemoglobinemia is suspected, by seeing the difference between oxygen saturation on an arterial blood gas and the measurement on a co-oximeter. Additionally, a direct methemoglobin level can be obtained.

== Prevention/Screening ==
As of 22 May 2007, the United States Environmental Protection Agency has established a maximum contaminant level of 10 mg/L for nitrate and 1 mg/L for nitrite in drinking water due to the potential harmful effects in infants.

A screening tool has been developed to screen for critical cardiac defects, which refers to cardiac lesions that require surgery or intervention in the 1st year of life. Screening for critical congenital heart defects should be done on all newborns after 24hours or shortly before discharge. Oxygen saturation is measured in the right hand and either foot.

A screening is considered positive if:

- Oxygen saturation < 90 % in either extremity,
- Oxygen saturation 90-94 % in both extremities on 3 measurements separated by an hour each,
- Oxygen saturation difference > 3 % between both extremities on 3 measurements separated by an hour each.

== Management ==
Treatment for blue baby syndrome will depend on the underlying cause.

When evaluating a patient for cyanosis or respiratory distress, vital signs should be monitored, especially the patient's heart rate and oxygen saturation. It is beneficial to have vascular access established. In newborns, the pulse oximeter is typically placed on the right hand to determine pre-ductal oxygenation, referring to oxygenation before the ductus arteriosus (connection between aorta and pulmonary artery). This gives the oxygenation level the heart and brain receive. Traditionally, supplemental oxygen is given in an escalating manner beginning with free-flowing oxygen, progressing to positive pressure ventilation or continuous positive airway pressure, and ending with mechanical intubation. The goal oxygen saturation is between 85 and 95 %. If an infant requires supplemental oxygen for a prolonged time it should be heated and humidified to avoid heat loss.

=== Cyanotic heart disease ===
Some babies born with cyanotic heart disease are treated with prostaglandin E1 after birth to keep the ductus arteriosus open and allow for more oxygenated blood to be pumped to the body. Many also receive oxygen therapy to increase the percentage of oxygen in the blood. Most of these babies will require surgery during infancy to correct their structural heart defect.

=== Severe methemoglobinemia ===
The first-line treatment for severe methemoglobinemia is methylene blue, a medication that will reduce methemoglobin in the blood. This is possible because methylene blue oxidizes NADPH, which in turn can convert methemoglobin back to hemoglobin.

== Epidemiology ==
Out of all the babies born with congenital heart defects, about 25 % have cyanosis as a result. Tetralogy of Fallot is the most common cyanotic cardiac heart defect.

Methemoglobinemia is considered to be rare, with acquired methemoglobinemia encountered more than the congenital form.

== Outcomes ==
In the case of cyanotic causing heart defects, about 75 % of infants survive to 1 year of age and 69 % survive to 18 years of age. These individuals have an increased risk of developmental delay, heart failure, or heart rhythm disorders.

Methemoglobinemia responds well to treatment; its prognosis is associated with the level of methemoglobinemia and the degree of end organ damage it can cause. Death can occur when levels reach 70 %.

== History ==
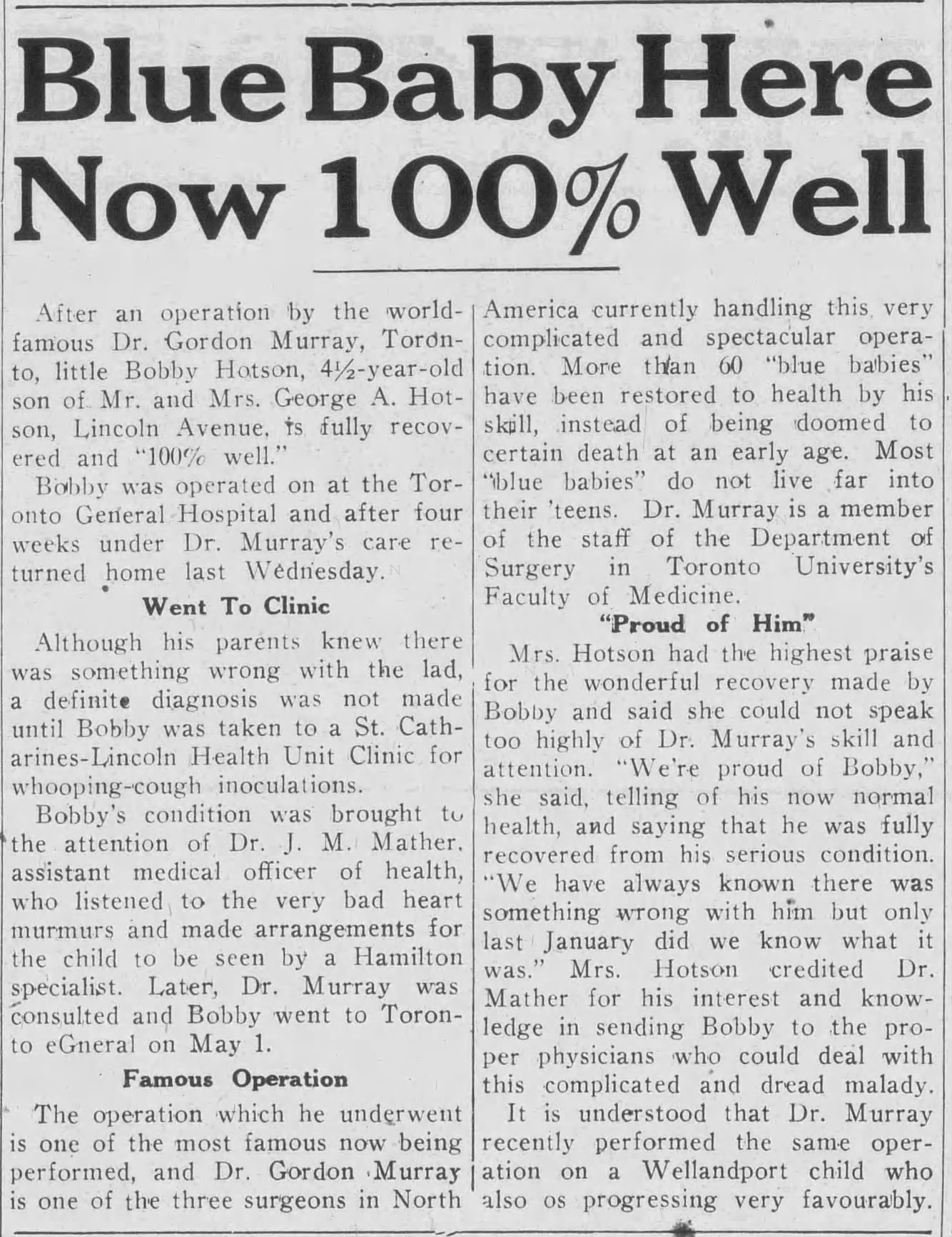
Blue baby here now 100% well (1947)

The first successful operation to treat blue baby syndrome caused by tetralogy of Fallot occurred at Johns Hopkins University in 1944. Through a collaboration between pediatric cardiologist Helen Taussig, surgeon Alfred Blalock, and surgical technician Vivien Thomas, the Blalock-Thomas-Taussig shunt was created. Dr. Taussig had recognized that children with Tetralogy of Fallot who also had a patent ductus arteriosus (PDA) typically lived longer, so the trio tried to create the same effect as a PDA by joining the subclavian artery to the pulmonary artery, relieving the child's cyanosis. The operation was published in the Journal of the American Medical Association in 1945 and impacted management of blue babies around the world.

Anna was the name of the dog who was the first survivor of the surgery, considered an experimental procedure at the time. Anna survived the first pulmonary bypass after having been operated on twice. The second operation was required to replace the original stitches with flexible ones. After their success with Anna, Blalock and Thomas had the courage to perform the very first open heart surgery on Eileen Saxon in 1944. In 1950, Anna's story was made into a movie, and the film has been shown to various schools and other groups.
