= John G. Webb =

Canadian interventional cardiologist

Professor John G. Webb FRCPC

McLeod Professor of Heart Valve Intervention, University of British Columbia

Personal details
- Occupation: Cardiologist

John G. Webb is a Canadian interventional cardiologist and the McLeod Professor of Heart Valve Intervention at the University of British Columbia. He is most well known for performing the first transfemoral and the first transapical transcatheter aortic valve implantation in the world both in 2005. He completed the first ever transcatheter mitral valve-in-valve replacement in 2009 and the first in-human TMVR (transcatheter mitral valve replacement) to be completed with the Neovasc Tiara device in 2014. In addition, he was an investigator in the PARTNER trial, a randomized clinical trial demonstrating the efficacy of TAVI compared to aortic valve replacement and medical intervention.

== Education ==
John G. Webb completed his undergraduate education at Simon Fraser University and graduated with his BSc (Hons) in Biology in 1978. He completed medical school at the University of British Columbia in 1982. He completed his internship at the University of Toronto Faculty of Medicine and completed his internal medicine residency back at the University of British Columbia in 1985. He completed a two-year fellowship in cardiology at the University of Toronto Faculty of Medicine and went to the University of California San Francisco for a two-year interventional cardiology fellowship as a Canadian Heart Foundation fellow.

== Career ==
He returned to UBC to work as an interventional cardiologist at St. Paul's Hospital in 1990. After the world's first transcatheter aortic valve implantation was performed using an antegrade transseptal approach by Prof. Alain Cribier in 2002 at the University of Rouen, Webb developed the transapical and retrograde transfemoral transcatheter aortic valve implantation in 2006 at St. Paul's Hospital in Vancouver. The transfemoral and transapical approach are now the two most common access routes used in TAVI today. He was appointed the McLeod Professor of Heart Valve Intervention in 2008.

== See also ==
- Alain Cribier - performed the first transcatheter aortic valve implantation in 2002
- TMVR Transcatheter Mitral Valve Replacement Systems
