= Cosme (name) =

Cosme is a given name and surname. Notable people with the name include:

== Given name ==
- Cosme (footballer) (1927–2011), Spanish footballer
- Cosme Argerich (1758–1820), Argentinian military physician
- Cosme Correa (fl. 1540s), Portuguese nobleman and colonizer of Bombay
- Cosme Damián de Churruca y Elorza (1761–1805), Spanish nobleman and soldier
- Cosme Damião (1885–1947), Portuguese football player and coach
- Cosme de Torres (1510–1570), Spanish Jesuit missionary
- Cosme Delgado (died 1596), Portuguese Renaissance composer
- Cosme García Sáez (1818–1874), Spanish inventor
- Cosme Martins (born 1959), Brazilian painter
- Cosmé McMoon (1901–1980), American pianist and composer
- Cosme Prenafeta (born 1971), Spanish volleyball player
- Cosme Saavedra (1901–1967), Argentine cyclist
- Cosme San Martín (died 1906), Chilean painter
- Cosme Rivera (born 1976), Mexican boxer
- Cosme Torres Espinoza (fl. 2000s), Cuban diplomat
- Cosmé Tura (1430–1495), Italian painter
- Cosme de Villiers (1683–1758), French bibliographer

== Surname ==
- Eusebia Cosme (1908–1976), Afro-Cuban poetry reciter and actress
- Fernando Nascimento Cosme (born 1983), Brazilian futsal player
- Gilbert Cosme (born 1975), Puerto Rican wrestler better known by his ring names, El Mesías and Ricky Banderas
- Laura Cosme (born 1992), Colombian footballer
- Niccolo Cosme (born 1980), Filipino photographer
- Pierre Cosme (born 1965), French historian
- Wilberto Cosme (born 1984), Colombian professional footballer
- Wilma Cosmé (born 1966), a Puerto Rican-American singer better known by her stage name Sa-Fire
