= Cosme =

Cosme, Cosmè, or Cosmé may refer to:

- Cosme (name), including a list of people with the given name or surname
- Cosme (restaurant), in New York City, United States
- Cosme District, Churcampa province, Peru
- Tropical Storm Cosme (disambiguation), various storms

== See also ==
- San Cosme (disambiguation)
- Cosmes, a French commune
- Cosmo (disambiguation)
