= Yaou =

Yaou may refer to:

== People ==
- Regina Yaou (1955–2017), Ivorian Coast writer
- Yaou Aïssatou (born 1951), the Director General of Cameroon's National Investment Corporation (NIS)

== Places ==
- Yaou, Ivory Coast

== See also ==
- Yao (disambiguation)
