= Michel Bercovier =

Professor of Scientific Computing

- מישל ברקוביאר
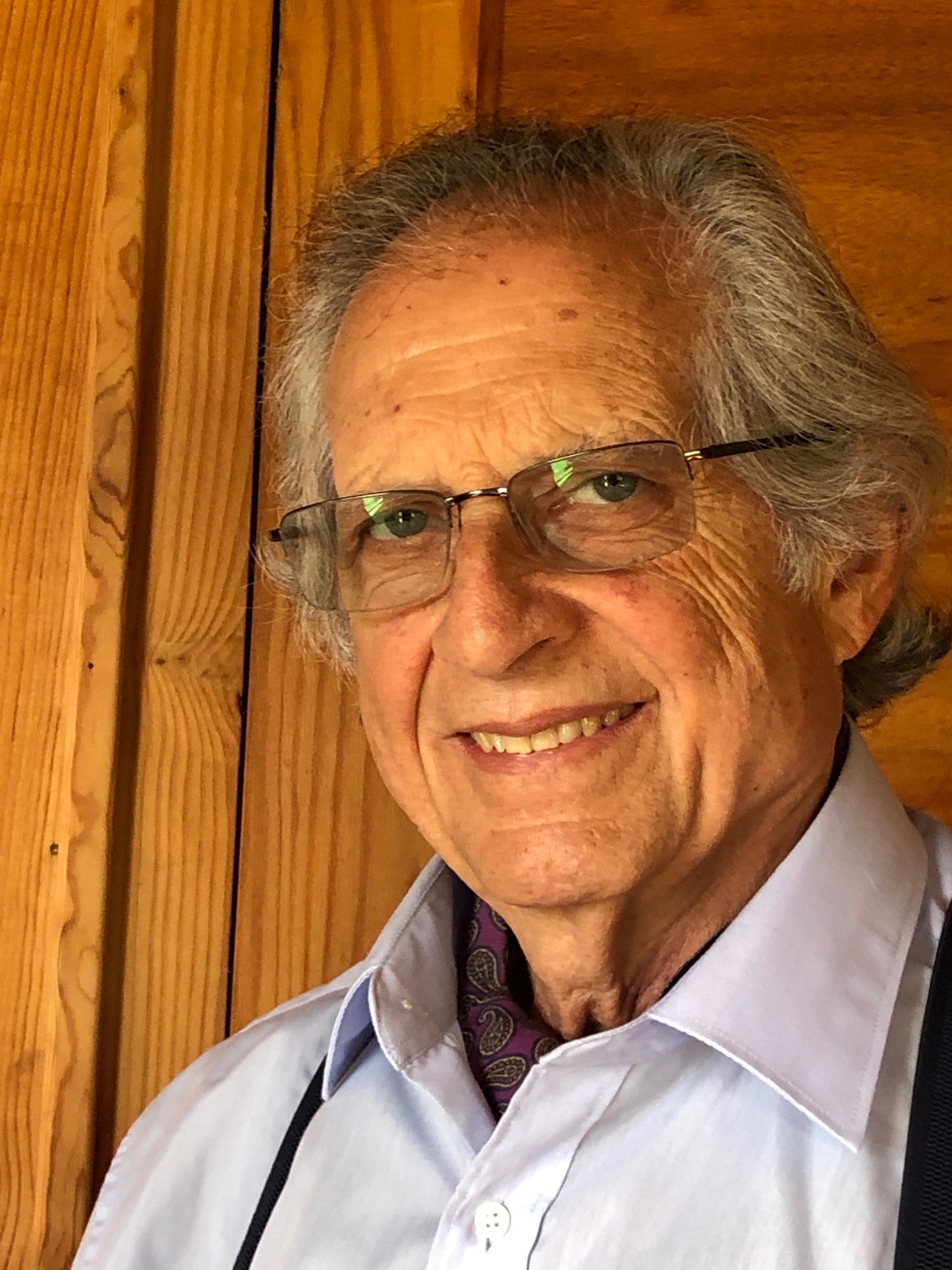
- Born: 10 September 1941 (age 85)
- Education: Paris University, University of Rouen
- Scientific career
- Fields: Scientific Computing; CAD
- Workplaces: Hebrew University, Hadassah Academic College

Michel Bercovier (Hebrew: מישל ברקוביאר; born: 10 September 1941) is a French-Israeli professor (emeritus) of Scientific Computing and Computer Aided Design (CAD) in The Rachel and Selim Benin School of Computer Science and Engineering at the Hebrew University of Jerusalem. Bercovier is also the head of the School of Computer Science at the Hadassah Academic College, Jerusalem.

== Early life and education ==
Michel Bercovier was born in Lyon, France. He received his BSc in mathematics from Paris University in 1964. He was from 1964 to 1965 vice president of Union of French Jewish Students and co-principal editor of its magazine Kadima. During the years 1965-67 he served in the French Army. He earned his D. Es Sc. in 1976 at the Faculté des Sciences de Rouen. Bercovier authored the thesis Régularisation duale des problèmes variationnels mixtes (Dual regularization of mixed variational problems), under the supervision of Jacques-Louis Lions. He belongs to the second generation of Lions' students.

== Career ==
Bercovier was an assistant professor at the University of Rouen (1969 - 1972) where he created the Computation Center. He emigrated to Israel in 1973 and was director of applications and services at the Hebrew University of Jerusalem Computer Center (1973 - 1976). He joined the School of Applied Sciences of the Hebrew University of Jerusalem as a Lecturer in 1977, becoming an associate professor in 1983, and moved to its Institute of Computer Science in 1986.

From 1997 until 2006 he held the Bertold Badler Chair of Computer Science as a full professor. In 1996-1998 Bercovier set up the Computer Science department of a new university at Paris-La Defense (Pôle universitaire Léonard de Vinci). From 1999 to 2007 he was in charge of the W3C office in Israel, and thus very active in the development of the Internet.

=== Retirement ===
He retired from the Hebrew University of Jerusalem in 2007 as an emeritus professor. From 2010 he is also a professor and head of the school of Computer Science at the Hadassah Academic College, Jerusalem. Bercovier has advised more than 30 M.Sc. and 16 Ph.D. students.

== Research ==
Professor Bercovier's research work focuses on Computer Aided Design and in Scientific Computation. He developed new Finite Element Methods for fluid flows and incompressible materials based on penalty and reduced integration methods that are universally implemented.Together with Pironneau, Olivier he proved the optimality of the Hood Taylor finite element for incompressible fluids. He has made contributions to the integration of Computer Aided Design (CAD) and Analysis, developed new methods in surface design, integrated optimal control methods in CAD and cloth simulation for animation.

He has been involved in multidisciplinary research, teaming with surgeons, biologists and pharmacologists (artificial heart valve modeling, Ca+ discharge in axons, keratotomical surgery, drug release models).

Bercovier carries joint research with INRIA, Pierre and Marie Curie University, EPFL, IMATI-Pavia, Institute of Applied Geometry (Johannes Kepler University Linz) and MIT, among others.

He is currently involved in several aspects of Isogeometric Analysis, such as smooth surfaces on arbitrary meshes and Domain Decomposition methods on arbitrarily overlapping domains. On the former subject, his book with Tanya Matskevitch is at the origin of numerous research on smooth surfaces over arbitrary quadrilateral meshes.

== Professional experience ==
Parallel to his academic work, Bercovier has been involved in industrial research: he was Chief Consultant for Kleber and Michelin (1972 – 1985), Hutchinson (1990-2017), Pechiney (1992-2017), L’Oréal (1996-2013).

He also contributed to the creation of several Hi-Tech companies: FDI (now part of Ansys, a US company, was based on his research, as was Bercom, a leading CAD/CAE Israeli firm. Bercovier was also the chairman of Aleph Yissum (now Ex Libris) in the years 1986 - 1996, and was active in turning the small start up into the leader in computer systems for libraries.

He contributed to the creation of the R&D team of Visiowave (Lausanne), which was acquired by General Electric. He is on the editorial board of several scientific journals. He is a member of SIAM, European Mathematical Society and ACM, on the board of SIA (Automotive Engineering Society in France) and ECCOMAS. He was a visiting fellow for long periods at IBM, Digital Equipment Corporation and Matra. He was a member of the scientific council of AMIES, Agency for Interaction in Mathematics with Business and Society, a founding member of the Israel Association for Computational Methods in Mechanics and co-founder and chairman of the World User Association in CFD (Computational fluid dynamics).

== Honors and awards ==
- Chevalier des Palmes Académiques (1986)
- Conseiller du Commerce Extérieur(fr) (1993, renewed 1995)

== Publications ==
Bercovier is the author of over 80 papers and 3 books.

=== Books ===
- Topics in computer aided geometric design. Barnhill RF., Bercovier M., Boehm W., Capasso V., eds Symposium on topics in computer aided geometric design held in Erice 1990 RAIRO MMAN 26, Duno Paris, 1992.
- Domain Decomposition Methods in Science and Engineering 18, Editor, With M.J Gander, Kornhubler and O Widlund, Springer, 2008.
- (with Tanya Matskevich) Smooth Bézier Surfaces over Arbitrary Quadrilateral Meshes Lectures Notes of the UMI, 22, Springer, 2017.

=== Selected articles ===
- Isogeometric analysis with geometrically continuous functions on multi-patch geometries, Kapl, Mario and Buchegger, Florian and Bercovier, Michel and Jüttler, Bert. Computer Methods in Applied Mechanics and Engineering (Vol 316, Pages 209-234), April 2017
- Overlapping non Matching Meshes Domain Decomposition Method in Isogeometric Analysis, Bercovier, Michel and Soloveichik, Ilya. February 2015.
- Efficient simulation of inextensible cloth. Goldenthal, Rony and Harmon, David and Fattal, Raanan and Bercovier, Michel and Grinspun, Eitan. ACM Transactions on Graphics (TOG) (Pages 49), 2007
- Curve and surface fitting and design by optimal control methods. Alhanaty, Michal and Bercovier, Michel. Computer-Aided Design (Volume 33, Pages 167–182), 2001
- Virtual topology operators for meshing. Sheffer, Alla and Bercovier, Michel and BLACKER, TED and Clements, Jan. International Journal of Computational Geometry & Applications (Volume 10, Pages 309–331), 2000
- “Discrete” G 1 assembly of patches over irregular meshes. Matskevich, T and Volpin, O and Bercovier, M. Proceedings of the international conference on *Mathematical methods for curves and surfaces II Lillehammer, 1997 (Pages 351–358), 1998
- The development of a mechanical model for a tyre: a 15 years story. Bercovier, Michel and Jankovich, Etienne and Durand, Michel. Proceedings of the Second *European Symposium on Mathematics in Industry: ESMI II, March 1–7, 1987, Oberwolfach (Pages 269), 1988
- Computer simulation of lamellar keratectomy and laser myopic keratomileusis. Hanna, Khalil D and Jouve, Francois and Bercovier, Michel H and Waring, George O. Journal of refractive surgery (Volume 4, Pages 222–231), 1988
- Finite elements and characteristics for some parabolic-hyperbolic problems. Bercovier, Michel and Pironneau, Olivier and Sastri, Vedala. Applied Mathematical Modelling (Volume 7, Pages 89–96), 1983
- The vortex method with finite elements. Bardos, Claude and Bercovier, Michel and Pironneau, Olivier. Mathematics of Computation (Volume 36, Pages 119–136), 1981
- A finite-element method for incompressible non-Newtonian flows. Bercovier, Michel and Engelman, Michael. Journal of Computational Physics (Volume 36, Pages 313–326), 1980
- Error estimates for finite element method solution of the Stokes problem in the primitive variables. Bercovier, Michel and Pironneau, Olivier. Numerische Mathematik (Volume 33, Pages 211–224), 1979
- A finite element for the numerical solution of viscous incompressible flows. Bercovier, Michel and Engelman, Michael. Journal of Computational Physics (Volume 30, Pages 181–201), 1979
- Perturbation of mixed variational problems. Application to mixed finite element methods. Bercovier, Michel. RAIRO. Analyse numérique (Volume 12, Pages 211–236), 1978

== Personal life ==
Bercovier is divorced, has three sons and lives in Jerusalem. His brother, Herve Bercovier, is a professor (emeritus) in the faculty of medicine at the Hebrew University of Jerusalem.

Michel Bercovier is a co-founder and honorary president of the Association du Festival Lyrique de Montperreux(fr).
