= Louis Jacob =

Louis Jacob may refer to:

- Louis Léon Jacob (1768–1854), French admiral and government minister
- Louis Jacob de Saint Charles (1608–1670), French Carmelite scholar, writer and bibliographer

== See also ==
- Louis Jacobs (disambiguation)
