= San Cosme =

San Cosme may refer to:

- San Cosme metro station, Mexico City
- San Cosme Department, Argentina
- San Cosme, Corrientes, Argentina
- San Cosme y Damián, Paraguay
