= Alain Cribier =

French cardiologist (1945–2024)

- Born: 25 January 1945; Paris, France
- Died: 16 February 2024 (aged 79); Rouen, Seine-Maritime, France
- Education: MD (University of Paris)
- Occupation: Cardiologist
- Known for: Pioneering surgical procedures

Alain Cribier, FACC, FESC (25 January 1945 – 16 February 2024) was a French interventional cardiologist, Professor of Medicine and Director of Cardiology at the University of Rouen's Charles Nicolle Hospital. Alain Cribier was best known for performing the world's first transcatheter aortic valve implantation in 2002, first transcatheter mitral commissurotomy in 1995, and first balloon aortic valvuloplasty in 1986.

== Early life ==
Alain Cribier was born on 25 January 1945. He had Romanian ancestry and, as a child, spent many holidays with his uncle in Brăila, which Cribier described as his "favourite place".

== Education ==
Cribier obtained his MD medical degree at the University of Paris and completed his early residency training there. Cribier began his cardiology residency at the University of Rouen in 1972 and in 1976 he spent a year in an interventional cardiology fellowship at the Cedars-Sinai Hospital in Los Angeles, California.

== Career ==
In 1983, Cribier was promoted to a Professor of Medicine and the Director of the Catheterization Lab at the University of Rouen. He developed and performed the world's first balloon aortic valvuloplasty in 1986. He performed the world's first mitral commissurotomy in 1995. Following discovery that the balloon aortic valvuloplasty for severe aortic stenosis was not effective in 80% of patients after one year he performed the first ever transcatheter aortic valve replacement (TAVR) in 2002. This procedure has now spread across the world and has saved countless patients' lives. In 1996, Cribier founded the Indo-French Foundation of Interventional Cardiology.

In 2011, Cribier was made Professor Emeritus at the Department of Cardiology at the University Hospital Charles Nicolle in Rouen, France.

From 2013, Cribier ran the MTC (Medical Training Center) in Rouen, a multidisciplinary centre dedicated to learning medicine through simulation, video-conferences and training between surgeons, physicians and experts.

== Death ==
Cribier died on 16 February 2024, at the age of 79.

== Awards and memberships ==
- FACC – Fellow of the American College of Cardiology
- FESC – Fellow of the European Society of Cardiology
- Ray C. Fish Award
- In 2017, Cribier received the Scientific Grand Prize of the Lefoulon-Delalande Fondation.
- In 2016, Cribier received the Legend of Medicine Award, C3 meeting in Orlando (USA) and the Gold Medal Award from the European Society of Cardiology in Rome, Italy.
- In 2015, Cribier received the Life Time Achievement Award, India-Live meeting in Chennai, India.

== See also ==
- John G. Webb – performed the first transapical transcatheter aortic valve implantation in 2006
