= Jean-Pierre Florens =

French econometrician

- Born: 6 July 1947; Marseille, France
- Education: Aix-Marseille University
- Scientific career
- Fields: Econometrics
- Workplaces: Toulouse 1 University Capitole; Toulouse School of Economics
- Doctoral advisor: Jean-Pierre Raoult

Jean-Pierre Florens (born 6 July 1947) is an influential French econometrician at Toulouse School of Economics. He is known for his research on Bayesian inference, econometrics of stochastic processes, causality, frontier estimation, and inverse problems.

== Biography ==
Jean Pierre Florens was born in Marseille in 1947, France. He completed his undergraduate studies in economics, political science, and mathematics at the Aix-Marseille University. He pursued graduate studies in mathematics at the University of Rouen. Florens is a fellow of the Econometric Society. He advised more than 50 Ph.D. students including many influential scholars. Alongside his career, Jean Pierre Florens had two children, Vincent and Clémentine with his wife Nicole Florens. He now has four amazing grandchildren named Sacha Florens, Mélissa Florens, Antoine Gallès and Marilou Gallès.

== Bibliography ==
Florens has written 3 books and over 100 articles.

=== Books ===
- Elements of Bayesian Statistics (Ed.), Marcel Dekker, 1990 (with Michel Mouchart and Jean-Marie Rolin).
- Econometric Modeling and Inference, Cambridge University Press, 2007 (with Velayoudom Marimoutou and Anne Peguin-Feissolle).
