= Olivier Pironneau =

French mathematician

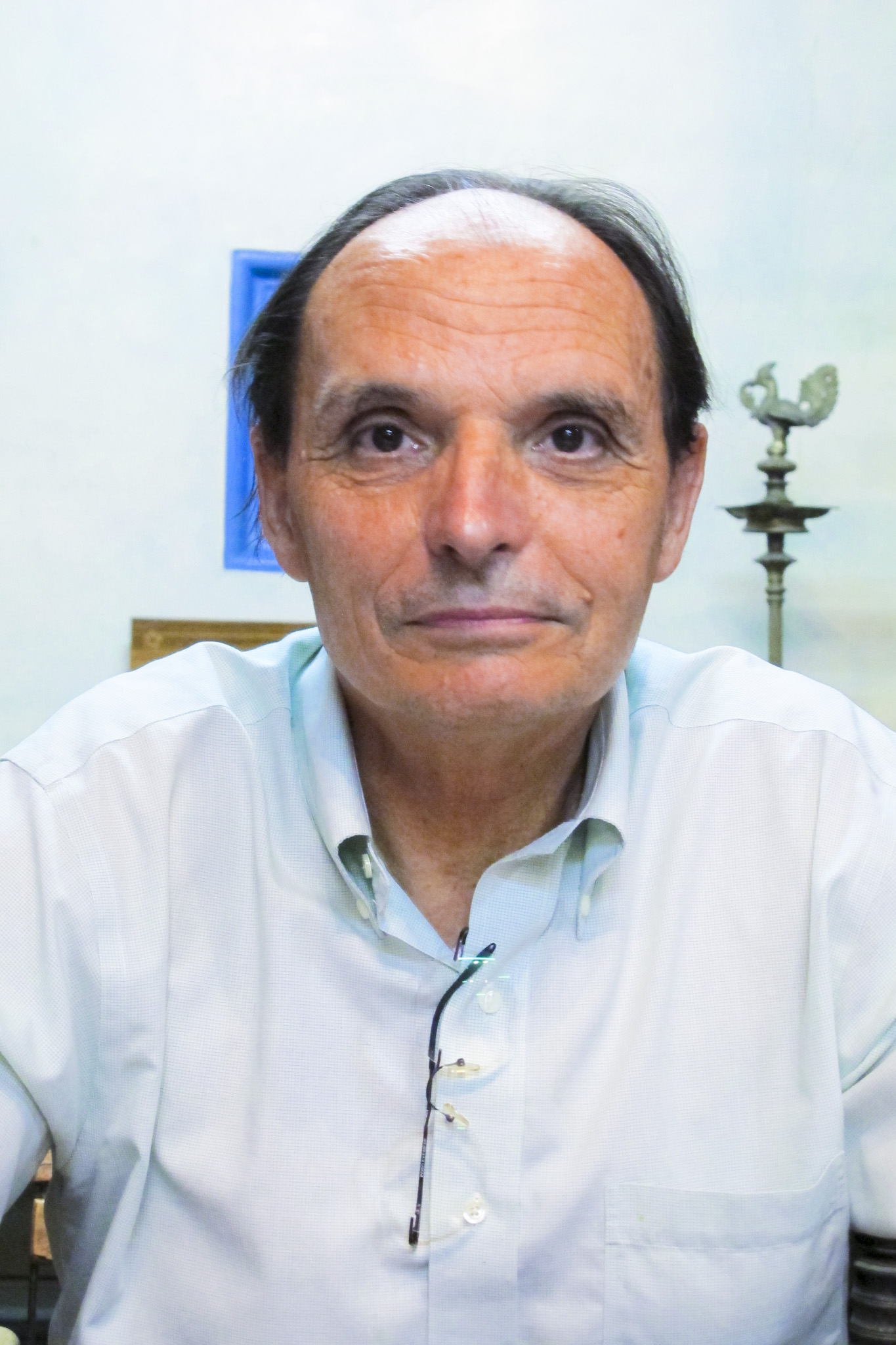
- Born: 24 July 1945 (age 81); Paris, France
- Education: Ecole Polytechnique, University of California Berkeley
- Known for: Scientific computing, FreeFem++
- Awards: Blaise Pascal prize (French Academy of Sciences), 1983; Marcel Dassault Prize (French Academy of Sciences), 2000
- Scientific career
- Fields: Scientific Computing
- Workplaces: Université Pierre et Marie Curie
- Doctoral advisor: Elijah Pollak
- Doctoral students: Yves Achdou; Bijan Mohammadi; Frederic Hecht

Olivier Pironneau (born 24 July 1945) is a French mathematician specializing in numerical analysis and scientific computing. He is professor emeritus at Sorbonne University, which includes its largest campus Jussieu, officially named "Pierre and Marie Curie Campus," and a member of the French Academy of Sciences. (Note: Pironneau's 2002 biography on the French Academy website reads: "A graduate of the École Polytechnique who also earned a Master's degree in mathematical economics in 1969, Olivier Pironneau obtained his doctorate in Optimization and Control from the University of California, Berkeley, in 1971. He specialized in computational fluid dynamics during a postdoctoral fellowship with Sir James Lighthill in Cambridge, UK; upon returning to France, he defended his Thèse d'État (State Doctorate) on shape optimization while working in Jacques-Louis Lions' team at INRIA. After five years at INRIA and numerous industrial collaborations, he joined the University of Paris North as a professor of computer science, and later the University of Paris VI as a professor of applied mathematics. He has authored five books and over 300 research papers. His scientific interests focus on computational methods for mechanics, physics, and quantitative finance.")

Pironneau was introduced before his 2022 Lecture on control theory as standing tall "like a colossus astride two areas, rigorous mathematical analysis on one side and extensive numerical computations on the other. He has pioneered the implementation of the finite element method to fluid flow problems, especially those relevant to the aeronautical industry. He has made important contributions be it theory or numerics to several areas connected to PDEs such as Navier-Stokes equations, conservation laws, optimal shape design, homogenization, mathematical finance and control theory to name a few."

Pironneau is a worldwide recognized expert in computational fluid dynamics, scientific computing, computational engineering, optimal design, numerical analysis and partial differential equations. He is a highly cited author, having written 8 books and 693 papers. He is a member of French Academy of Sciences since 2002. He was awarded the Marcel Dassault Prize by the French Academy of Sciences in 2000. He is also the recipient of the Blaise Pascal Prize of the French Academy of Sciences in 1983, the Ordre National du Mérite (1989) and is an Associate member of the Russian Academy of Sciences since 2004. His group has developed the software FreeFem++ which is used by researchers worldwide for finite element computations.

Pironneau has published many papers with his doctoral advisor Elijah (Lucien) Polak from 1971 to 2005.

== Selected bibliography ==
- Pironneau, Olivier (182). "On the transport-diffusion algorithm and its applications to the Navier-Stokes equations". Numerische Mathematik. 38 (3): 309–332. doi:10.1007/BF01396435. S2CID 54058051.

== See also ==
- Partial differential equations
- Scientific computing
- Finite elements
- List of École Polytechnique alumni
