= Sorbonne Paris North University =

French university in Paris

Coordinates: 48.956214°N 2.341933°E

- Université Sorbonne Paris Nord
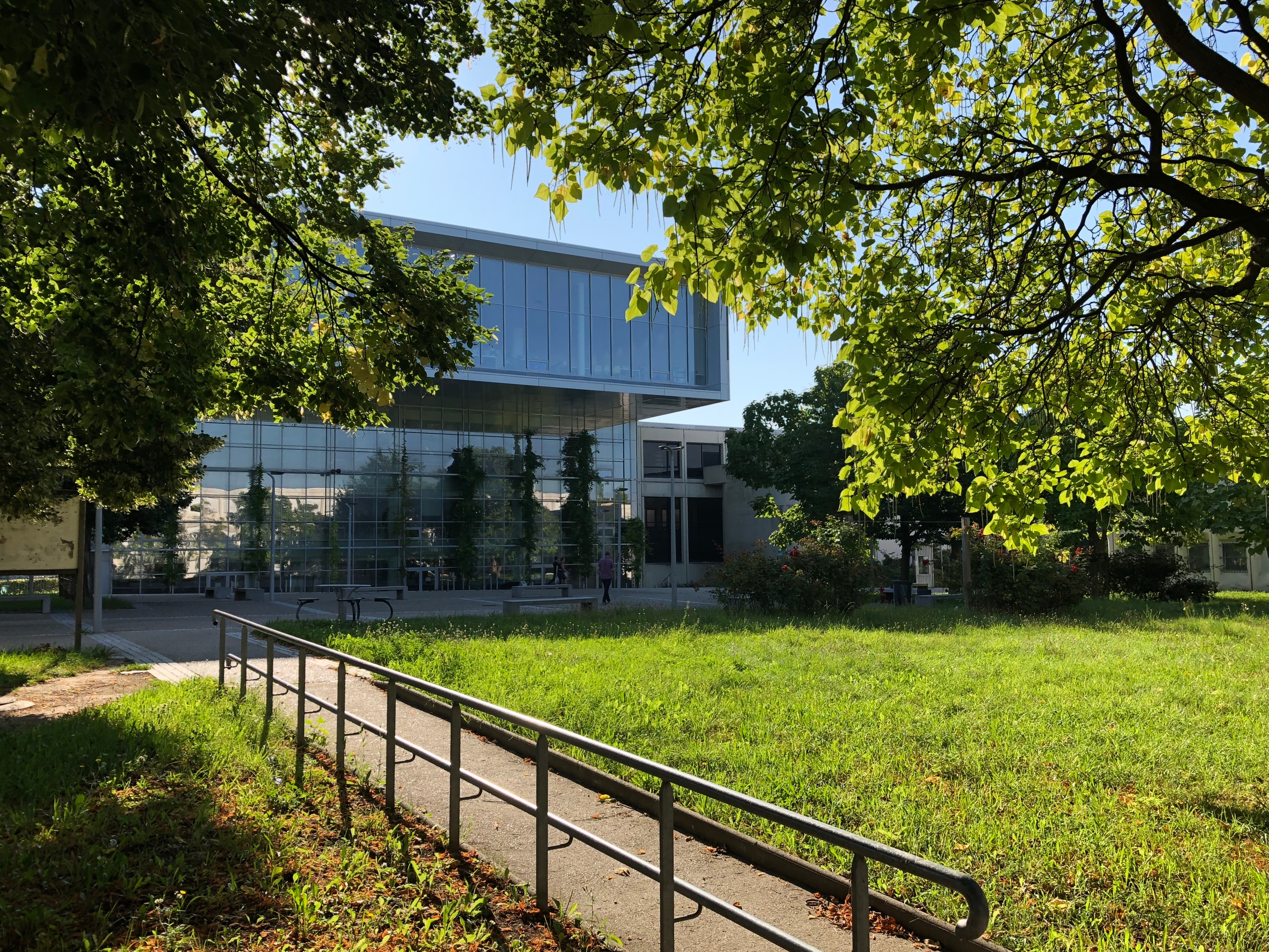
- Villetaneuse campus
- Type: Public university
- Established: 1970, following the division of the University of Paris (1253)
- Affiliations: Sorbonne Paris Cite
- Endowment: €62,708,000
- President: Christophe Fouqueré
- Faculty: 1,181
- Students: 23,078
- Undergraduates: 14,953
- Postgraduates: 7,523
- Doctoral students: 602
- Location: Villetaneuse, Saint-Denis, and Bobigny, Île-de-France, France
- Campus: Multiple campuses
- Website: https://www.univ-spn.fr/

Sorbonne Paris North University (French: Université Sorbonne Paris Nord), also known as Paris 13, is a public university based in Paris, France. It is one of the thirteen universities that succeeded the University of Paris in 1968. It is a multidisciplinary university located in north of Paris, in the municipalities of Villetaneuse, Saint-Denis, La Plaine Saint-Denis, Bobigny and Argenteuil.

Successively named "Université Paris XIII", "Université Paris-Nord", "Université Paris 13 Paris Nord", then "Université Paris 13", it has been known by several names during the last half century. Most recently it was renamed "Université Sorbonne Paris Nord" on January 1, 2020.

The University Sorbonne Paris Nord is a major teaching and research center located north of Paris. It has five campuses, spread over the two departments of Seine-Saint-Denis and Val d'Oise: Villetaneuse, Bobigny, Saint-Denis, the Plaine Saint-Denis and Argenteuil.

The university has more than 25,000 students in initial or continuing training, in many fields: Health, Medicine and Human Biology - Letters, Languages, Humanities and Societies - Law, Political and social sciences - Communication sciences - Economics and management.

== History ==
=== Creation ===
The University Paris-13 was created after the desire of the Rector of the Academy of Paris in the early 1960s, of opening a third faculty of science at Villetaneuse. In September 1969 was also created at Saint-Denis, a science-based university center with status of faculty, in the University of Paris, called University Centre Saint-Denis – Villetaneuse.

In 1970, with the application of Law Faure reform, was decided to create 13 autonomous multidisciplinary universities, which replaced the faculties of the University of Paris, and the faculty of Villetaneuse became the University of Paris XIII.

The new university was designed by the architects Fainsilber and Anspach, as part of the renovation of the town of Villetaneuse. The first stage was the construction of the literary and legal center, expected to receive approximately 5000 students. The first building, completed in October 1970, allowed the first 1500 students in December 1500, of first-year of law, economics and humanities. In 1972, the University of Paris XIII completed the building of two libraries, the Library of the University Centre of Saint-Denis and the Library of Villetaneuse university center.

Following the dismantling of the University of Paris, the chancellor of universities of Paris owns the buildings and land of the establishment. The Chancery of Creteil universities provides budgetary control and the university of legality.

=== Name of the university ===
Decree No. 70-1174 of 17 December 1970 on the public, scientific and cultural character of universities gave the university the name of Paris-XIII. Since its establishment, the university has been referred to informally as "University of Paris-13 North" or "University Paris-Nord".

On 16 May 2014, the Board of Directors decided to rename the university: University Paris-13 (Université Paris 13 in the statutes) in compliance with the law on the Liberties and Responsibilities of Universities.

In the 2019 re-organization of the Paris university system, the university announced it would start styling itself as "Université Sorbonne Paris Nord".

=== Presidents ===
| Mandat | Nom | Corps | Discipline |
|---|---|---|---|
| 1970-1973 | Jean-René Saurel | University professor | Physics |
| 1973-1977 | Marcel Jozefowicz | University professor | Physics |
| 1977-1982 | Maurice Nisard | University professor | Law |
| 1982-1987 | Pierre Jaisson | University professor | Ethology |
| 1987-1992 | Pierre Cornillot | PU-PH | Clinical pathology |
| 1992-1997 | Jean-François Mela | University professor | Mathematics |
| 1997-2002 | Michel Pouchain | University professor | Economy |
| 2002-2008 | Alain Neuman | PU-PH | Medical imaging |
| 2008-2016 | Jean-Loup Salzmann | PU-PH | Histology |
| 2016-2020 | Jean-Pierre Astruc | University professor | Physics |
| 2020- | Christophe Fouqueré | University professor | Information technology |

== Campus ==
The university premises are spread over five campuses:

- Villetaneuse Campus
- at Saint-Denis, the Technology University Institute of Paris XIII (Institut universitaire de technologie de Paris XIII or IUT in French)
- La Plaine Saint-Denis Campus
- Bobigny Campus, holds a Technology Institute and Medicine
- Argenteuil Campus

The university offers also law and physical education studies in Athens, Greece, in affiliation with IdEF College.

=== Villetaneuse ===
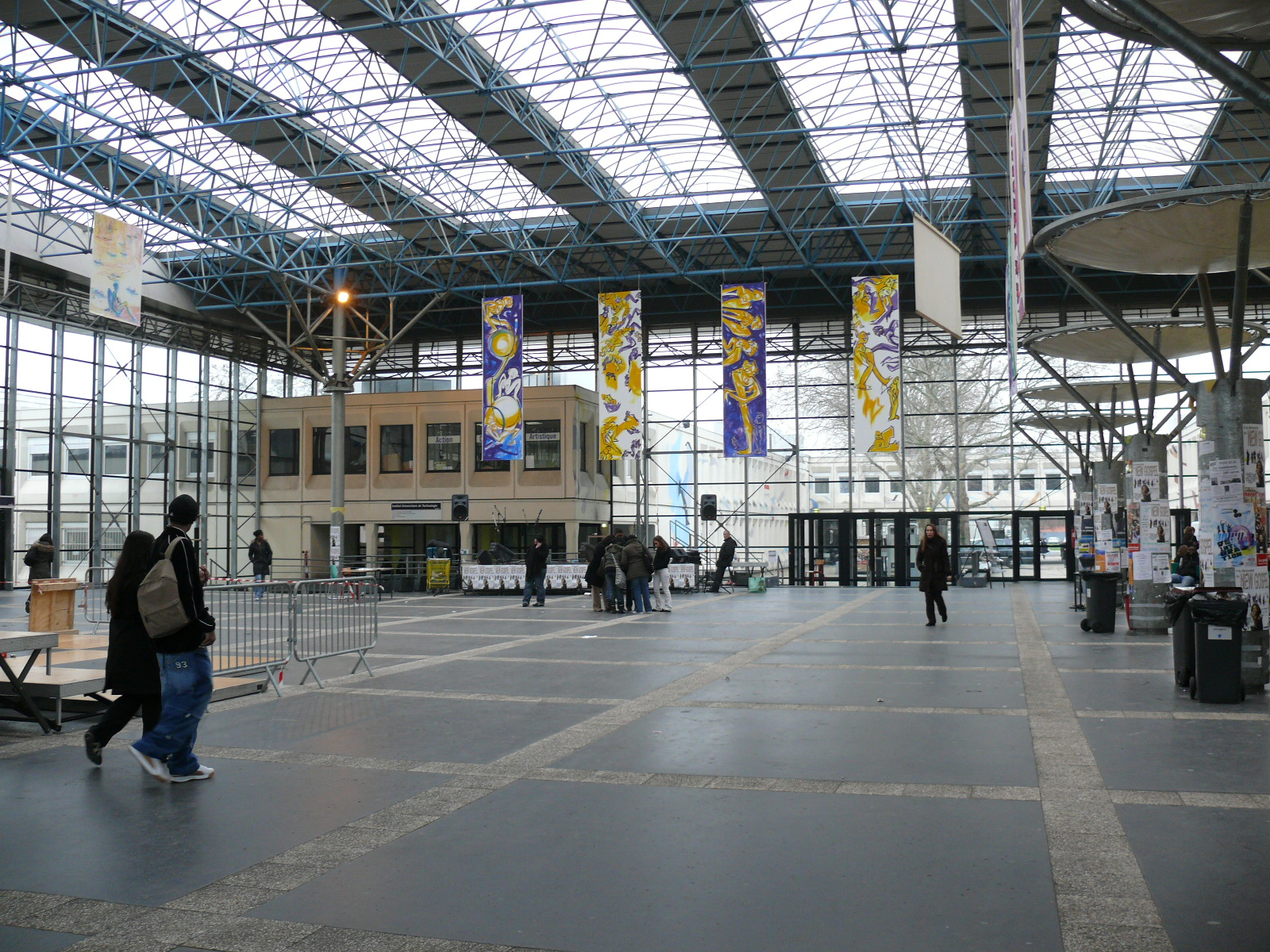
The forum of the Villetaneuse campus.

The Villetaneuse campus is the main and historic campus of the university. It has the larger number of students and research units. This campus holds also the presidential buildings and central services of the university. On the side of the search, besides the Office of Research and Doctoral Studies, the campus is home to the administrative services of graduate schools Erasmus and Institut Galilée, and also of the research units. The campus made significant investments since 2010 to improve the transport connections, by building a new station known as Gare de Villetaneuse-Université. A new library was opened on the campus in spring 2016. The IUT homes a cleanroom dedicated to nanotechnology research.

=== Bobigny ===
The Bobigny campus is dedicated to medicine, health and human biology, and has the UFR SMBH and the IUT of Bobigny. The campus is side of the Avicenna hospital with which the university is in agreement to form the Avicenna University Hospital, main training center in medicine department of Seine-Saint-Denis. The campus also host several research units related to medicine (mostly joint research units with the INSERM) and the UFR SMBH but also some units or humanities teams whose research theme is related to medicine (LEPS for therapeutic patient education, or UTRPP for psychopathology). This is the second university campus.

=== Saint-Denis ===
The campus at Saint-Denis houses the Technology university institute (Institut universitaire de technologie or IUT in French).

== Academics ==
The university offers Bachelors, Masters and Doctorate degrees in line with the Bologna Process. Bachelor and Masters courses are organized into various schools.

- School of Literature, Languages, and Humanities (LLHS)
- School of Law, Politics and Social Sciences (DSPS)
- School of Communication (COM)
- Galilee Institute
- School of Health, Medicine and Human Biology (SMBH)

=== Doctoral Schools ===
The university awards around 110 doctorates each year and welcomes around 700 doctoral scholars on exchange from other institutions. There are three doctoral schools:

- Ecole Doctorale Erasme for humanities, social sciences, law and economics.
- Ecole Doctorale Galilée for sciences
- Ecole doctorale médicament, toxicologie, chimie, imageries (MTCI) for medicine, toxicology, chemistry and graphics, run with Paris Descartes University within the framework of the Sorbonne Paris Cité federation.

== Notable people ==
=== Faculty ===
- Claude Goasguen (1976–1986)
- Loïc Vadelorge
- Bruno Le Roux – member of the National Assembly and former Minister of the Interior (1988–1998)
- Ngô Bảo Châu – mathematician and 2010 Fields Medalist (1998–2005)

=== Alumni ===
- Nicușor Dan (born 1969) - president of Romania (2025-); PhD in mathematics
- Julien Dray (born 1955) – member of the National Assembly
- Laurent Fignon (1960–2010) – cyclist and two-time winner of the Tour de France
- Daniel Goldberg (born 1965) – member of the National Assembly
