= Esther Dang =

Cameroonian economist (born 1945)

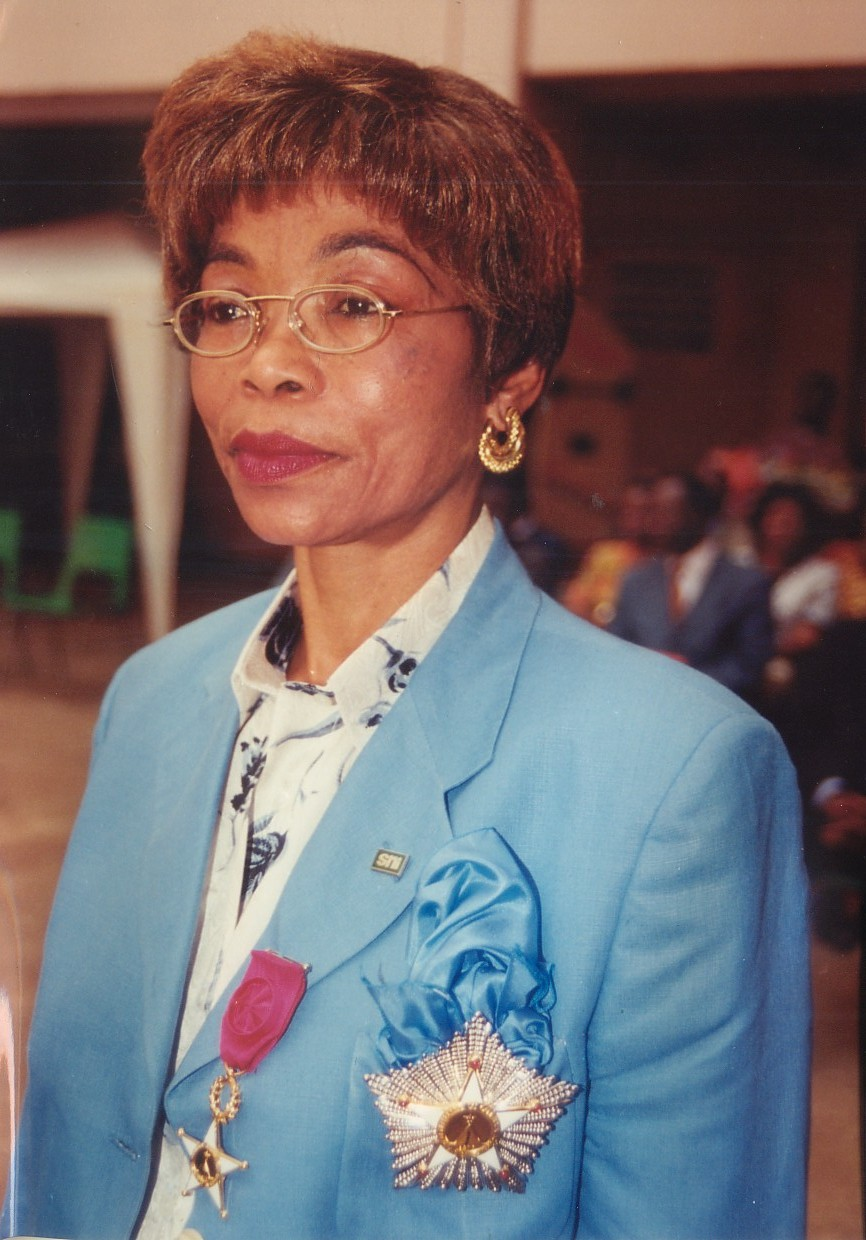
- with awards
- Born: March 5, 1945 (age 81); Mbalmayo
- Occupation: Economist
- Employer: National Investment Company (SNI)
- Known for: director general of the National Investment Company (SNI)

Esther Dang (born March 5, 1945) is a Cameroonian economist. She resigned as the director of the Cameroon National Investment company and stood as a presidential candidate.

== Life ==
Dang was born in Mbalmayo in 1945. She began at University of Yaoundé in 1966 and proceeded until 1969 when she went to the University of Grenoble where she continued to study economics. She graduated in 1971. Dang has a doctorate in economics from the Sorbonne.

She was promoted by René Owona, who was the minister of industrial development, to lead the director general of the Cameroon National Investment Company Société nationale d'investissement du Cameroun on 1 October 1990. Owena and Simon Ngann Yonn, who was the organisation's managing director, both died in 2004.

She was the director general and she resigned from this position in an angry dispute. She was replaced by Yaou Aïssatou who had been the minister for women.

She was a candidate to be the president in Cameroon in October 2011. She was one of three women who stood as candidates. Another was Edith Kahbang Walla, but the main candidates were Paul Biya and Ni John Fru Ndi. There was about 50 candidates and Paul Biya was re elected with a large majority in the 2011 Cameroonian presidential election. Dang came 11th with 0.33% of the vote.

In 2016 Dang sent an open letter to the president after the 2016 Eséka train derailment had caused dozens of deaths and blocked any transport between two of Cameroon's major cities. The letter asked many searching questions about the president's record and his plans for the future. The numerous questions included "Why do you refuse to develop Cameroon?" and "What in your opinion is the purpose of a Head of State?"
