= Michel Thellier =

French plant physiologist

Michel Thellier, born on December 8, 1933, in Arcueil, is a French plant physiologist. Member of the French Academy of sciences.

== Course ==
Attracted by both biology and physics, Michel Thellier has developed a dual culture by passing, at the Faculty of Sciences of Paris, a degree in biology-geology (1954-1955) later supplemented by in-depth plant physiology, nuclear physics and radioactivity, physical theories. Assistant (1956), Head of Works (1958) and Assistant Professor (1962) at the Faculty of Sciences of Paris, Doctor of Science (1963) after his return from military service, Professor in Tunis [scientific and technical cooperation] (1963-1966) then in Rouen (1966-1994) where he directed the Laboratory associated with the CNRS Cell Physiology, Signals and Regulations (1978-1990). He formed a team and engaged in collaborations that took their full part in his scientific work. Editor-in-Chief of the American journal J. Trace Microprobe Techniques[Marcel Dekker Inc., New York] (1994-2000), Elected to the French Academy of sciences (1991) and the Académie d'Agriculture de France (2000), Professor emeritus (1994).

== Military service ==
Performed in the Navy as an Instructor in Nuclear Physics and Aggressive Radioactive Physics (1960-1962) with the rank of Ship Ensign [Lieutenant equivalent in other weapons]. Promoted to the rank of Ship Lieutenant (H) [Captain's equivalent] (1986).

== Scientific work ==
Michel Thellier, who entered the research through the study of boron plant nutrition (an essential element, but at an extremely low dose), due to the lack of a radioisotope of sufficient duration, used the stable isotope 10B as a tracer by detecting it thanks to its large cross-section effective for the reaction (n, α). First using the neutrons from the ZOE nuclear cell, he was the first to measure flux and perform boron imaging in plant samples. He generalized the Li, N and O method for animal and plant samples, obtaining in particular the first image of the distribution of lithium in the brain of mice subjected to lithium treatment similar to that used at the time for manic-depressive psychosis in humans. Then he used secondary ion emission microscopy tools to do with stable isotopes almost everything that is traditionally done with radioactive isotopes, and eventually obtained SIMS (Secondary Ion Mass Spectrometry) equipment for his laboratory.

For flows, he proposed replacing the so-called "Michaëlenne" formulation by a flux/force formulation, linear as long as the forces are not too high, and showed that it is also possible to achieve oscillating behaviours. Active transport has been produced by artificial, relatively simple and symmetrical systems, which may have had a role in prebiotic stages. The intervention of structures induced by their own functioning has been taken into account.

Some experiments suggesting information storage, he proposed that a form of memory exists in plants: memory of the storage/recall type, calcium-dependent and probably involving ionic condensation effects. English and German versions of his little book on plant memory have been published by Springer. The subject is expanding rapidly, with several groups now taking an interest in it in various countries. In a chapter of Springer's recently published collective book "Memory and Learning in Plants", Michel Thellier et al. highlight its ecological role in plants' adjustment of their development to local environmental conditions.

== Pedagogical activity ==
As university professor, Michel Thellier was an active teacher, not hesitating to carry out the Directed Works corresponding to his courses himself. In 1972, he organized at the University of Rouen and then operated for a few years an "Initiation to the Use of Radioisotopes" internship [recognized by the Interministerial Commission on Artificial Radioelements], which he then gradually entrusted to a collaborator.

Now retired, he volunteers to organize scientific talks for EHPAD residents.

== Other institutional responsibilities ==
- Member of Section 27 [Plant Biology and Physiology] of the CNRS National Committee (1971-1976)
- Member of the Standing Committee of Section 27 of the CNRS (1974-1976)
- Member of the Executive Committee of the Euratom ITAL Wageningen Laboratory, (1974-1977)
- Chairman of the "Advanced Course Committee" of the "Federation of the European societies for plant physiology" (1975-1978)
- Chargé de mission at the Direction des Sciences de la Vie of the CNRS (1975-1979)
- Member of the Permanent Mission of Studies to the Direction of the CNRS (1975-1979)
- President of Section 26 [Plant biochemistry and biology] of the CNRS National Committee (1987-1992)
- Expert for the IAEA (International Atomic Energy Agency): 4 missions to Costa Rica (1987, 1992, 1994 and 1997)
- Member of the CNRS Departmental Council (1987-1992)
- Assistant Editor of the "Life Sciences" series of the C.R. Acad. Sci. Paris (1988-2000)
- Member of the CNRS Committee on Methods, Models and Theories (1992-1999)
- Member of Expert Group No. 5[Biology, Life Technology, Health] of the Ministry of Higher Education and Research (1994-1996)
- Chief Editor of the American newspaper J. Trace Microprobe Techn[Marcel Dekker Inc., New York] (1994-2000)
- Delegate of the Section of Animal and Plant Biology at the French Academy of sciences (1996-1999)
- Member of the Jury of the Bower Award [Benjamin Franklin Institute, Philadelphia] (1996-1998)

== Distinctions ==
- Louis Bonneau Prize from the Académie des Sciences-(1970)
- Correspondent of the Academy of Sciences (1983)
- Knight of the National Order of Merit (1989)
- Member of the Academy of Sciences (1991)
- Honorary Professor of the University of Wolverhampton, UK (1992)
- Commander in the Order of Academic Palms (1995)
- Member of the Académie d'Agriculture de France ( 2000)
- Chevalier of the Légion d'Honneur (2004)

== Bibliography (books) ==
- M. Thellier, A. Monnier, M. Demarty et J. Dainty [eds.]Transmembrane ionic exchanges in plants,, Editions du CNRS et Publications de l’Université de Rouen (1977)
- P. Delattre et M. Thellier [eds.] Elaboration et justification des modèles: applications en biologie, Maloine, Paris (1979)
- M. Thellier et J.C. Wissocq [eds.] Lithium kinetics, Marius Press, Carnforth, UK (1992)
- M. Thellier et C. Ripoll, Bases thermodynamiques de la biologie cellulaire, Masson, Paris (1992)
- H.E. Goldbach, B. Rerkasem, M.A. Wimmer, P.H. Brown, M. Thellier et R.W. Bell [eds.] Boron in plant and animal nutrition., Kluver Academic / Plenum Publishers, New York, (2002)
- M. Thellier Les plantes ont-elles une mémoire ?, Quae (2015)
- M. Thellier [Traduction par Ulrich Lüttge] Haben Pflanzen ein Gedächtnis ?, Springer (2017)
- M. Thellier Plant responses to environmental stimuli. The role of specific forms of plant memory, Springer (2017)
