= Louis Jacob de Saint Charles =

French Carmelite scholar, writer and bibliographer

Louis Jacob de Saint Charles (Latin form Ludovicus Jacob; 20 August 1608 – 10 March 1670) was a French Carmelite scholar, writer and bibliographer.

He published the first yearly lists of printed books.

== Life ==
He was born at Châlons-sur-Marne (according to some at Chalon-sur-Saône), the son of Jean Jacob and Claudine Mareschal. He entered the Order of Carmelites of the Old Observance in his native town, and made his profession 11 June 1626. While in Italy (1639) he took great interest in epigraphy, regretting the wholesale destruction of inscriptions in the catacombs.

A lasting fruit of his sojourn in Rome was the completion and publication of the "Bibliotheca Pontificia", begun by Gabriel Naudé, a work not free from errors and mistakes. On his return to France he obtained the post of librarian to Cardinal de Retz, and later on the dignity of royal councillor and almoner. At a later period he became librarian to Achille de Harlay, first president of the parliament, in whose house in Paris he lived and finally died, aged 61.

== Works ==
Besides the work already mentioned, and some twelve books which he edited for their respective authors, he left, according to the "Bibliotheca Carmelitana" (II, 272), twenty-seven printed works and sixty manuscripts. They include:

- A relation of the procession held 17 July 1639, at the church of Sts. Sylvester and Martin at Rome in honour of Our Lady of Mount Carmel (Paris, 1639)
- Catalogue of authors proving René Gros de Saint-Joyre, the poet, to have been related to Pope Clement IV (Lyons, 1642)
- The panegyric of Ven. Jeanne de Cambry, of Tournay, Augustinian nun (Paris, 1644)
- Lists of Paris publications for 1643-44 and 1645
- List of French publications for 1643–45

Among his manuscript notes were collections of bibliographical notices concerning his order, which were utilized by Martialis a S. Johanne Baptista (Bordeaux, 1730), and Cosme de Villiers (Orleans, 1752).
