= Christian Gouriéroux =

French econometrician

- Born: 1949 (age 76–77)
- Education: University of Rouen
- Scientific career
- Fields: Statistics; Econometrics
- Workplaces: University of Toronto; Center for Research in Economics and Statistics
- Doctoral advisor: Jean-Pierre Raoult

Christian Gouriéroux (born 1949) is an econometrician who holds a Doctor of Philosophy in mathematics from the University of Rouen. He has the Professor exceptional level title from France. Gouriéroux is now a professor at University of Toronto and CREST, Paris [Center for Research in Economics and Statistics].

Gouriéroux has published in journals worldwide, and was a recipient of the Koopmans Prize (with two fellow partners) for their project, "General Approach to Serial Correlation" in 1985–1987. He was also awarded the Silver Medal of the Conseil National de Recherche Scientifique by the French Ministry of Research. He is a fellow of the Econometric Society. He is a researcher of the Banque de France - ACPR Chair.

== Biography ==
Gouriéroux completed his undergraduate studies in economics and statistics at ENSAE. He has received Doctorat honoris causa from Université de Mons-Hainaut, Université de Neuchâtel, as well as HEC Montréal.

== Works ==
Gouriéroux has written 17 books and over 160 articles, including 12 Econometrica. He is known for his work on the Quasi-maximum likelihood estimate and Indirect inference

Books

- Financial Econometrics: Problems, Models, and Methods.
- Simulation-Based Econometric Methods. Oup/Core Lecture Series.
- Statistics and Econometric Models. Themes in Modern Econometrics.
- Time Series and Dynamic Models. Themes in Modern Econometrics.
- Statistique de l'assurance. Collection "Economie et statistiques avancées".
- ARCH Models and Financial Applications. Springer Series in Statistics.

Articles/Essays/Papers

- Gourieroux, Christian; Jasiak, Joann (2002). "Nonlinear Autocorrelograms: An Application to Inter-Trade Durations". Journal of Time Series Analysis. 23 (2): 127–154. doi:10.1111/1467-9892.00259. S2CID 5882434.
- Gourieroux, C.; Monfort, A. (2004). "Infrequent Extreme Risks". The Geneva Papers on Risk and Insurance Theory. 29 (1): 5–22. doi:10.1023/B:GEPA.0000032563.83435.50. S2CID 55416745.
- Darolles, Serge; Florens, Jean-Pierre; Gouriéroux, Christian (2004). "Kernel-based nonlinear canonical analysis and time reversibility" (PDF). Journal of Econometrics. 119 (2): 323–353. doi:10.1016/S0304-4076(03)00199-4.
- Gourieroux, C.; Jasiak, J. (2004). "Heterogeneous INAR(1) model with application to car insurance". Insurance: Mathematics and Economics. 34 (2): 177–192. doi:10.1016/j.insmatheco.2003.11.005.
- Ghysels, Eric; Gouriéroux, Christian; Jasiak, Joann (2004). "Stochastic volatility duration models". Journal of Econometrics. 119 (2): 413–433. doi:10.1016/S0304-4076(03)00202-1.
- Gourieroux, Christian; Jasiak, Joann (2001). "Memory and infrequent breaks". Economics Letters. 70 (1): 29–41. doi:10.1016/S0165-1765(00)00346-3.
- Dionne, Georges; Gouriéroux, Christian; Vanasse, Charles (2001). "Testing for Evidence of Adverse Selection in the Automobile Insurance Market: A Comment". Journal of Political Economy. 109 (2): 444–453. doi:10.1086/319557. S2CID 154681165.
- Dhaene, Geert; Gourieroux, Christian; Scaillet, Oliver (1998). "Instrumental Models and Indirect Encompassing". Econometrica. 66 (3): 673–688. doi:10.2307/2998579. JSTOR 2998579.
- Gourieroux, C.; Monfort, A.; Trognon, A. (1984). "Pseudo Maximum Likelihood Methods: Theory" (PDF). Econometrica. 52 (3): 681–700. doi:10.2307/1913471. JSTOR 1913471. S2CID 122981013.
- Gourieroux, C.; Monfort, A.; Trognon, A. (1984). "Pseudo Maximum Likelihood Methods: Applications to Poisson Models". Econometrica. 52 (3): 701–720. doi:10.2307/1913472. JSTOR 1913472. S2CID 122906184.

== Bibliography ==
- Christian S. Gouriéroux: IDEAS File
- Global Investor Profile
