= Paul Rollin =

French academic (1932-2003)

Paul Rollin (January 22, 1932 – September 9, 2003) was a French academic. He was successively president of the University of Rouen, and rector of the academies of Rennes, Versailles and Aix-Marseille. In between his various positions as rector, he acted twice as policy adviser to Jean-Pierre Chevènement and Lionel Jospin, both French Ministers of National Education. He was an Officier de la Légion d'Honneur, a Chevalier de l'Ordre national du Mérite and an Officier des Palmes académiques.

== Childhood and early life ==
Paul Rollin was born in 1932 in Bordeaux and lived around Marseille up until 1938 where he and his family moved to Oran, Algeria until 1945. Once a young adult, he moved to Paris and studied natural sciences in university. In 1955, he became assistant at the Science Faculty of Paris, and in 1962, he completed a state doctorate study. Two years later, in 1964, he moved to Rouen where he became a Senior Lecturer at the Sciences Faculty of Rouen. He married Monique Lambert in 1955 and they had three children.

== Career ==
From a title of professor without chair in 1967, he became a full time faculty member in 1969, and finally the dean of the University of Rouen just a year later. That same year, as the head of a research laboratory associated to the Centre National de la Recherche Scientifique, he became member of the CNRS advisory committee. In 1976, still in Rouen, Paul Rollin became the President of the University of Sciences.

Appointed rector of the academy of Rennes in 1981, he had to renounce his activities as rector in 1984 to become a primary policy adviser to the French Minister of National Education Jean-Pierre Chevènement. Afterwards, from 1986 to 1988, he was Rector of the academy of Versailles.

In 1988, he was again appointed by the French Minister of National Education, Lionel Jospin, to be his policy adviser, where he worked specifically on the "Loi d'orientation sur l'éducation". After the mandate of the Minister ended in 1990, Paul Rollin became Rector of the academy of Aix-Marseille. He retired from his position in 1996, and enjoyed retirement in his childhood region of Provence.

== Retirement ==
During his retirement, he dedicated his time to the writing of three books about the French educational system. The first one being "L'éducation aujourd'hui", written in 1997, where he described the current educational system. In June 1999, 26 centuries after the creation of the city of Marseille, he published a new book called "26 Siècles d'éducation à Marseille: Une Chronique du Temps Passé" describing centuries of evolution of the educational system in the region of Marseille. And in February 2003, he published "L'éducation en Vaucluse à travers les siècles", his final work, where he described once again, the historical transformation of education in the region of northern Provence. Paul Rollin died from Lou Gehrig's disease on September 9, 2003.
