= Gabriel Naudé =

French librarian, scholar and writer (1600–1653)

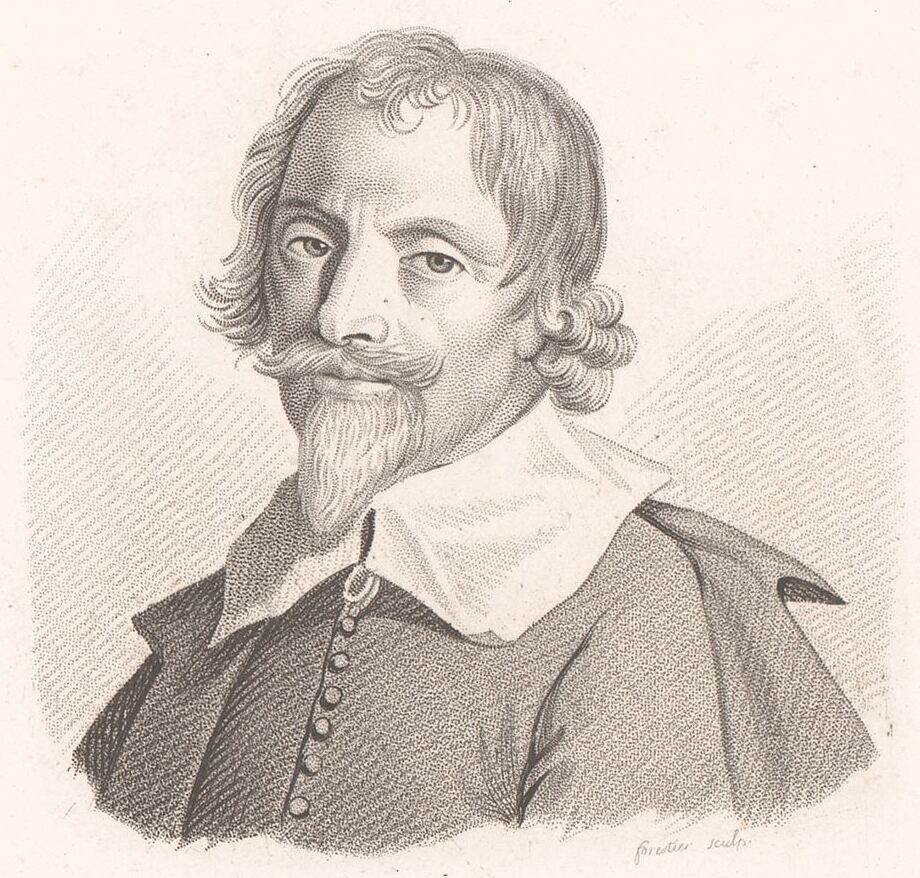
- Born: 2 February 1600; Paris, France
- Died: 10 July 1653 (aged 53); Abbeville, now Hauts-de-France, France
- Occupations: librarian, scholar, prolific writer, physician

Gabriel Naudé (2 February 1600 – 10 July 1653) was a French librarian and scholar. He was a prolific writer who produced works on many subjects including politics, religion, history and the supernatural. In 1627, he published an influential book in the field of library science called Advice on Establishing a Library. Naudé was later able to put into practice all the ideas he had put forth in Advice when he was given the opportunity to build and maintain the Bibliothèque Mazarine, the library of Cardinal Mazarin at Paris.

Naudé was a precursor of Pierre Bayle and Fontenelle.

== Biography ==
Naudé was born in Paris in early 1600 to a family of modest means. His father was a lowly official and his mother a young illiterate woman. He was described by his teachers as tenacious and passionate about his education. Naudé entered college at a young age where he studied philosophy and grammar. Later he studied medicine at Paris and Padua (where he attended Cesare Cremonini's lessons), and became physician to Louis XIII.

At the age of twenty, Naudé published his first book Le Marfore ou Discours Contre les Lisbelles. The work would bring him to the attention of Henri de Mesme, président à mortier of the Parlement of Paris. Mesme offered Naudé the job of librarian to his personal collection. Mesmes had a large library for the period (about 8,000 volumes) and it was open to scholars who had the appropriate references. Naudé's service in Mesme's library would give him experience which he would use later to write the book Advice on Establishing a Library. Naudé wrote Advice for Mesme as a guide for building and maintaining his library. In 1629 he became librarian to Cardinal Guidi di Bagno in Rome, and on Bagni's death in 1641 librarian to Cardinal Francesco Barberini.

At the desire of Cardinal Richelieu he began a controversy with the Benedictines, denying Jean Gerson's authorship of De Imitatione Christi. Richelieu intended to make Naudé his librarian, and on his death Naudé accepted a similar offer from Cardinal Mazarin. For the next ten years he devoted himself to bringing together from all parts of Europe the assemblage of books known as the Bibliothèque Mazarine. Mazarin had brought with him to Paris a collection numbering over 5,000 volumes. Like Naudé, he believed in an open library to be used by the public for the public good. In 1642 he purchased a building to house his library and he instructed Naudé to build up the finest collection possible.

The fastest way was to absorb entire libraries into the collection, advice that Naudé included in his book. Naudé plundered secondhand book sellers, and Mazarin instructed his ambassadors, government officials and generals to collect books for him. Naudé was able to travel Europe, and during one trip that lasted several months he collected more than 14,000 volumes. By 1648 the library had built up to an estimated at 40,000 volumes. It was open on a regular basis and had built up a sizable number (almost 100) of regular patrons, and several staff members to keep it functioning properly. It became the first in France to be open for all, without references.

Mazarin's library was sold by the Parlement of Paris during the troubles of the Fronde, and Queen Christina invited Naudé to Stockholm. He was not happy in Sweden, and on Mazarin's appeal that he should re-form his scattered library, Naudé returned at once. His health was broken, however, and he died on the return journey, in Abbeville on 10 July 1653.

He was the friend of Gui Patin, Pierre Gassendi and all the liberal thinkers of his time. Naudé's was a colleague of the humorists and scholars who prepared the way for the better-known writers of the siècle de Louis XIV.

== Career as a librarian ==
Naudé, in his career as a librarian, "opposed censorship, and encouraged library owners to allow others to use their books, a practice he considered a great honor for the owner – an honor equal to that of having the opportunity to build a fine library." Naudé found it favorable to collect original format of books and to keep the volumes collected intact. He was a true believer of considering the needs of those that would access them and felt strong consideration to be sought from the experts in each particular field. He was adamant about collecting in all languages, about all religions, subject matters, and literature.

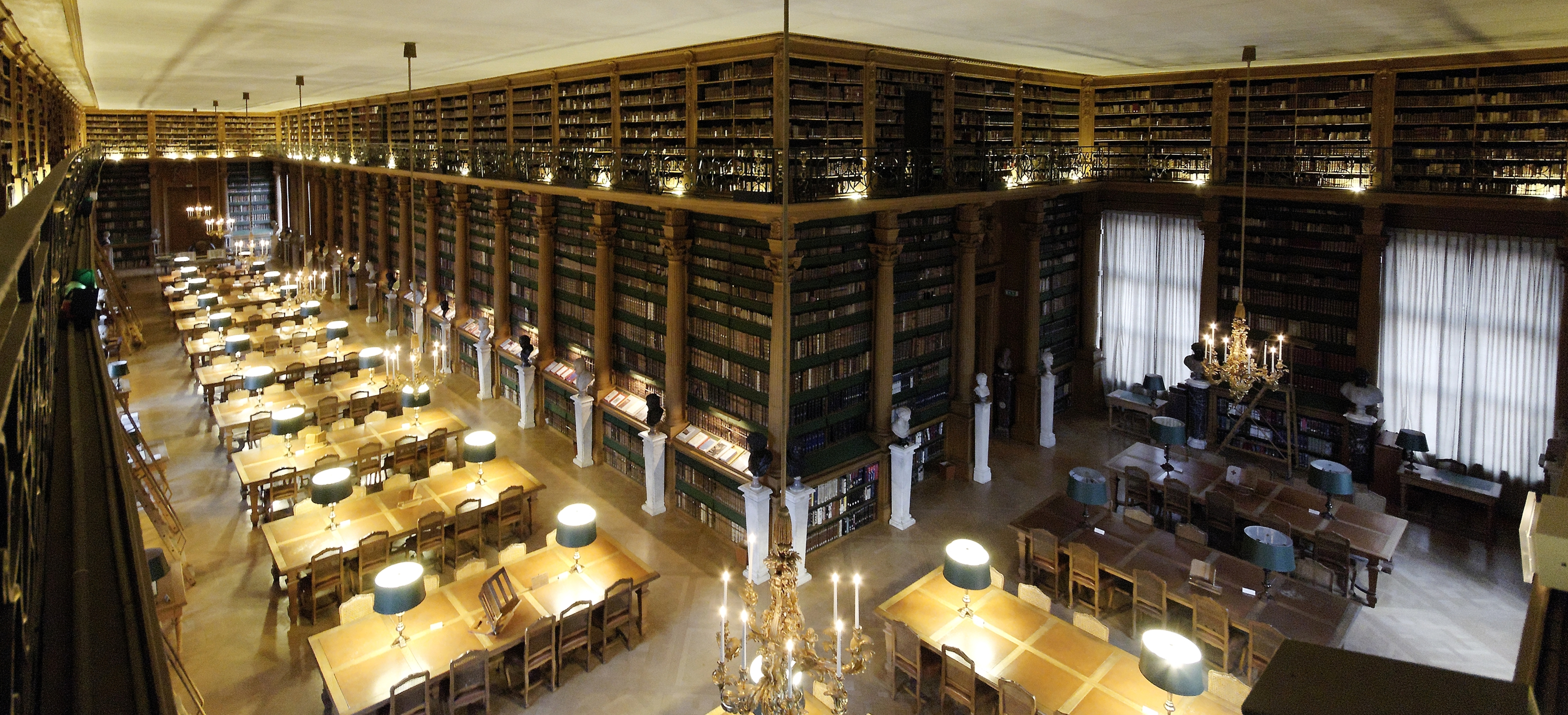
Reading room of the Bibliothèque Mazarine (2010)

During his career in librarianship, Naudé helped instruct collectors and libraries in the selection and acquisition of their titles and how to create catalogs for their libraries. He was a major proponent of scouring secondhand bookshops and print shops for valuable and hard-to-find literary works. "When Naudé has been in town, the booksellers' shops seem devastated as by a whirlwind. Having bought up in every last one of them all the books, whether in manuscript or in print, dealing in any language whatever with any subject or division of learning no matter what, he has left the stores stripped and bare."

Naudé also had interesting ideas on the locale where a library should be located. "While centrally located within the community it serves, a library should be at some distance from the noisiest streets. It should, if possible, be situated between some spacious court and a pleasant garden, from which it may enjoy good light, a wide and agreeable prospect, and pure air, unpolluted by marshes, sinks, or dunghills; the whole arrangement so well planned and ordered that it is compelled to share nothing unpleasant or obviously inconvenient."

Probably the most famous library that Naudé helped shape, and in which he served as librarian, was the Bibliothéque Mazarine in Paris, the library of Cardinal Jules Mazarin in the rue de Richelieu. Naudé spent ten years of his life improving and shaping the Bibliothéque. It became the first publicly accessible library in France because of Naudé's insistence and was open to the public as early as 1644.

As a librarian and scholar, Naudé proposed "to direct a wealthy collector into paths of bibliothecarian righteousness" as a result of his belief that the current century had advanced far beyond their predecessors with regard to the quantity and quality of the information or resources that they had access to. Naudé's seminal work on library science, Advice on Establishing a Library, served as an early instruction manual or guide for private collectors who were interested in the book acquisition and maintenance process. Naudé encouraged collectors (and fellow librarians) to organize their books meticulously by "their number and the range of their subject matter, the criteria of selection, and the means of procurement", in addition to the arrangement of the building(s) that book collections may be stored in and other potential methods of book cataloging. Naudé's knowledge and expertise left a lasting impact on both the library community and the world at large, with his influence guiding collectors, scholars, politicians, and religious leaders.

== Artistic portrayals ==
Naudé is the subject of Peter Briscoe's novel, The Best Read Man in France.

== Works ==
Including works edited by him, a list of ninety-two pieces is given in the Naudaeana. The principal ones are:

- Le Marfore, ou discours contre les libelles (Paris, 1620), very rare, reprinted 1868;
- Instruction à la France sur la vérité de l'histoire des Frères de la Roze-Croix (1623, 1624), displaying their impostures;
- Apologie pour tous les grands personages faussement soupçonnez de magie (1625, 1653, 1669, 1712), Pythagoras, Socrates, Thomas Aquinas Jerome Cardan and Solomon are among those defended;
- Advis pour dresser une bibliothèque (1627, 1644, 1676; translated by John Evelyn, 1661), full of sound and liberal views on librarianship and considered as a founding stone of library science;
- Addition à l'histoire de Louys XI (1630), this includes an account of the origin of printing;
- Bibliographia politica (Venice, 1633, etc.; in French, 1642);
- De studio liberali syntagma (1632, 1654), a practical treatise found in most collections of directions for studies;
- De studio militari syntagma (1637), esteemed in its day;
- Considérations politiques sur les coups d'état (1639). A disciple of Machiavelli, he considered that politics must be rendered "autonomous from morality, sovereign in relation to religion"

A Bibliotheca Pontificia was completed and seen into print by Louis Jacob.

== Advice on establishing a library ==
Advice on establishing a library, written as a set of instructions for a private collector, was based on Naudé's own experience and research. In the introduction to his book, Naudé wrote that he is not an expert in the field of librarianship but he presented what he believed to be the most important ideas. He based some of the opinions in Advice on his own experience in Mesme's library, and wrote out for Mesme the accepted practices and principles of librarians of the time. Chapters each covered topics such as number of books, selecting the books, procuring the books, and so forth.

Naudé's first chapter poses the question, "Why establish a library?" He answered the question with a simple message; there is no greater honor than building a great library and sharing it with the public. Naudé believed libraries should model themselves after the best libraries of the world. The first task is to create a plan. Before a person can erect a library, he must educate himself on the subject of collecting and organizing books. A person must also seek the guidance of those who have already built their own libraries or are in the process. He suggested studying and copying the catalogues of other libraries.

Naudé devoted an entire chapter to book selection, remarked upon throughout. The first authors who need to be purchased are those considered experts in their respective fields. Regardless whether they are ancient or modern works, if a book were held in high regard by practitioners of a particular field then it should be present in any collection. In addition, any well known interpretations or commentaries that exist are a necessity. Naudé suggested purchasing books in the original languages because meaning can often be lost in translation. He stood strongly against censorship of any kind. Naudé believed that every book has a reader regardless of the subject, and that information should be free and available. Readers could always find use of a book, even if that use were to refute the ideas presented on its pages. Certain books are popular at times but later forgotten: he argued that it would be beneficial to a library if there were multiple copies of these books to accommodate the popular tastes of the times.

In his chapter on book acquisition, Naudé offered concise tips. The easiest way is to purchase another library in its entirety. Naudé went on to praise secondhand book sellers who often provided good books at cheap prices. Naudé himself browsed book-binding and printing shops for used paper, and once had discovered a rare manuscript that a book binder was using as scrap paper.

Naudé included a chapter in Advice for arranging the books. In discussing arrangement he quoted Cicero's De Oratore: "It is order that gives light to memory" (from De Oratore 2.353). He gave instructions that he considered logical. His subject headings included theology, philosophy, jurisprudence, medicine, history, mathematics and humanities. Naudé would add other subject headings in later years, but these categories best represented the known body of knowledge in the world. Each section, he said, should be divided into subheadings and begin with the principal authors followed by the commentaries.

Translated into many different languages (including English, German, Danish, Italian, and Modern Greek) and boasting at least 37 different editions, this book is widely regarded as a foundational text for the study of Library Science and Naudé's seminal work.

== See also ==
- Marie de Gournay
