= Justine Mintsa =

Gabonese writer (born 1949)

Justine Mintsa (Oyem, 8 September 1949) is a Gabonese writer and member of the Fang people. She is the third child of twelve siblings. She earned her doctorate in English Literature from the University of Rouen in 1977. She is a member of the Haut Conseil de la francophonie. She was the first African woman to publish a novel with Éditions Gallimard, in Paris.

She studied at the Omar Bongo University.

== Works ==
- Un seul tournant Makôsu, La Pensée Universelle, 1994; L'Harmattan, 2004.
- Premières lectures, 1997
- Histoire d'Awu, Continents noirs, Gallimard, 2000.
- Larmes de cendre, 2010
