= Louis Jacobs (disambiguation) =

Louis Jacobs may refer to:

- Louis Jacobs (1920–2006), a Masorti rabbi in the United Kingdom
- Louis L. Jacobs, American vertebrate paleontologist
- Louis Jacobs (businessman). American businessman and sports team owner
- Lou Jacobs (footballer) (1884–1936), Australian rules footballer

== See also ==
- Lewis Jacobs (1904–1997), American author, director and publisher
- Lou Jacobs (1903–1992), an auguste clown
- Louis Jacob (disambiguation)
