= Loïc Vadelorge =

French historian

Loïc Vadelorge, born 26 November 1964, graduate from École Normale Supérieure Lettres et Sciences Humaines, is a French historian, teacher of contemporary history at the Paris 13 University, after having been Senior Lecturer at the Versailles Saint-Quentin-en-Yvelines University from 1998 to 2009 and at the University of Rouen from 1992 to 1994.

He argued in 1996 a doctoral thesis at the Paris-Sorbonne University, under the supervision of Jean-Pierre Chaline on the theme "For a cultural history of the native. Rouen from 1919 to 1940". Member of the Research Centre Economies, Societies, Cultures, his research focuses on the history of cultural policies, the history of new towns and the history of the equipment. He has conducted investigations for the French Comité d'histoire du ministère de la Culture et des institutions culturelles (collective History Committee of the Ministry of Culture and History Interdepartmental and evaluation of new towns).

== Bibliography ==
- Rouen sous la IIIe République. Politiques et pratiques culturelles (Rouen under the Third Republic. Cultural policies and practices), Rennes, Presses universitaires de Rennes, 2005, 441 p. (ISBN 2-7535-0035-5).
- With Philippe Poirrier, Pour une histoire des politiques du patrimoine (For a history of heritage policies), Paris, La Documentation française / Ministère de la Culture, Comité d'Histoire, 2003
- « La Mémoire des villes nouvelles » (Memory of new towns), Ethnologie Française, 1, 2003
- Éléments pour une histoire des villes nouvelles (Elements for a history of new towns), Paris, Manuscrit.com, collection Manuscrit Université, 2004
- Gouverner les villes nouvelles. L’État et les collectivités locales (1960-2005) (Manage the new towns. State and local governments (1960–2005)), Paris, Manuscrit.com, collection Manuscrit Université, 2005
- L’action culturelle dans les villes nouvelles (Cultural action in the new towns), Paris, La Documentation française, Comité d’histoire du ministère de la Culture, Programme interministériel d’histoire et d’évaluation des villes nouvelles, 2005
- Habiter les villes nouvelles (Living the new towns), Paris, manuscrit.com, 2006
