= Pierre Cosme =

French historian (born 1965)

Pierre Cosme (born 1965) is a French historian and academic, specializing in ancient Rome.

== Biography ==
Pierre Cosme who graduated from the École normale supérieure de lettres et sciences humaines (class 1985), is agrégé d’Histoire and was a member of the École française de Rome from 1993 to 1996. His thesis focused on the uses of writing in the Roman army.

He was maître de conférences at the university of Poitiers and Pantheon-Sorbonne University, as well as at the IUFM of Paris. He has been a professor at the university of Rouen since September 2010.

== Bibliography ==
=== Thesis ===
- 1995: Armée et bureaucratie dans l’Empire romain (de la Guerre Sociale aux Sévères)

=== Selection of articles ===
- 1993: "Le livret militaire du soldat romain", in Cahiers du centre Gustave Glotz, pp. 67–80
- 1994: "Les légions romaines sur le forum : recherches sur la colonnette Mafféienne", in Mélanges de l'École française de Rome, 106/1, 1994, pp. 167–196
- 2003: "Le châtiment des déserteurs dans l’armée romaine", in Revue historique de droit français et étranger, 81/3, p. 287-307

=== Participation to collective works ===
- 2003: "Le cep de vigne du centurion, signe d'appartenance à une élite ?", in Mireille Cébeillac-Gervasoni and Laurent Lamoine, Actes du Colloque : Les élites et leurs facettes. Les élites locales dans le monde hellénistique et romain, organised by the University Clermont II-Blaise Pascal, l'U.M.R. 8585 and the École française de Rome, Rome-Clermont-Ferrand, CEFR-309 ISBN 978-2-845-16228-0, pp. 339–348
- 2004: "L'évolution de la bureaucratie militaire romaine tardive : optiones, actuarii et opinatores", in Yann Le Bohec and Catherine Wolff, L'armée romaine de Dioclétien à Valentinien Ier, Actes du Congrès de Lyon (September 2002) », Lyon, Collection du Centre d'Études Romaines et Gallo-Romaines, Nouvelle série, n° 26, ISBN 2-904974-25-3 BnF 392107212, p.397-408
- 2006: "Qui commandait l'armée romaine ?", in Ségolène Demougin, Xavier Loriot and Pierre Cosme, Actes du Colloque international : H.-G. Pflaum : un historien du XXe siècle, organised in Paris by the École pratique des hautes études in October 2004, Geneva, Droz, ISBN 978-260-001099-3, pp. 137–156
- 2007: "Les fournitures d'armes aux soldats romains", in Lukas de Blois and Elio Lo Cascio, The Impact of the Roman Army (200 BC - AD 476). Economic, Social, Political, Religious and Cultural Aspects. Proceedings of the Sixth Workshop of the International network Impact of Empire (Capri, March 29-April 2, 2005) , Leyde–Boston, Brill, 2007, ISBN 978-90-04-16044-6 BnF 411217638, pp. 239–260

=== Monographies ===
- 1998: L’État romain entre éclatement et continuité, l'Empire romain de la mort de Commode au concile de Nicée (192–325), Seli Arslan, Paris, ISBN 978-2-842-76016-8
- 2005: Auguste, Perrin, ISBN 978-2-262-03020-9
- 2007: L'armée romaine, VIIIe siècle av JC - Ve siècle ap JC, Armand Colin, ISBN 978-2-200-26408-6
- 2011: Les empereurs romains, PUF, ISBN 978-2-130-56823-0
- 2011: Rome et son empire, Hachette, ISBN 978-2-011-46151-3
- 2011: L'année des quatre empereurs, Éditions Fayard ISBN 978-2-213-65518-5
- 2014: Auguste, maître du monde: Actium, 2 septembre 31 av. J-C, Éditions Tallandier ISBN 979-10-210-0332-3
