= Cosme Torres Espinoza =

Cuban diplomat

Cosme Torres Espinoza was the ambassador of Cuba to Zimbabwe until 2009. He previously served as deputy chief of the Cuban Interests Section in Washington, DC.
