= San Cosme Department =

San Cosme Department Departamento San Cosme (Spanish) Tetãvore Sán Kósme (Guarani)
- Department
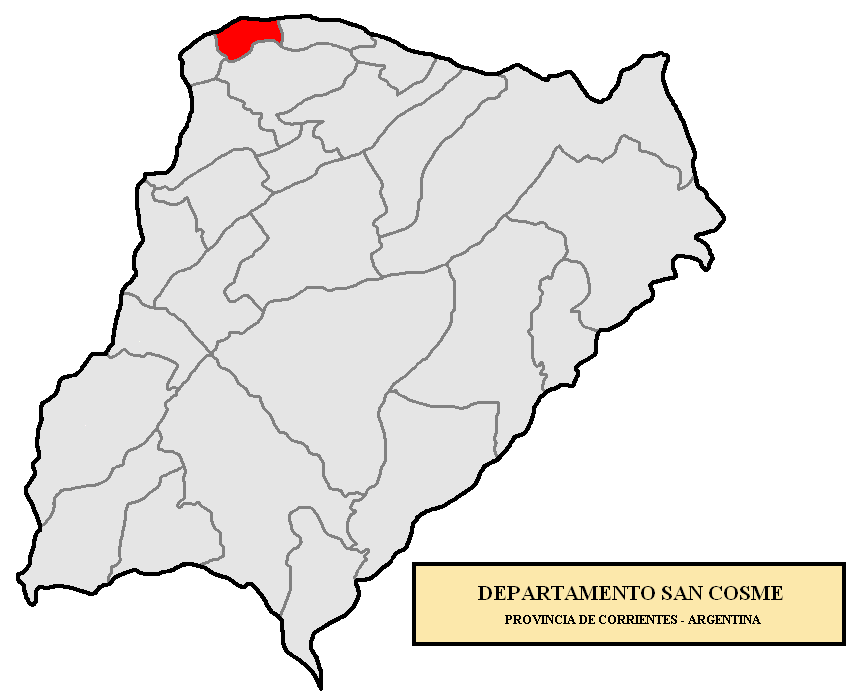
- location of San Cosme Department in Corrientes Province
- Coordinates: 27°31′S 58°34′W
- Country: Argentina
- Seat: San Cosme

Area
  - Total: 595 km^{2} (230 sq mi)

Population (2001 census [INDEC])
  - Total: 13,189
  - Density: 22.2/km^{2} (57.4/sq mi)
- Postal Code: W3420
- Area Code: 03783

San Cosme Department is a department of Corrientes Province in Argentina.

The provincial subdivision has a population of about 13,189 inhabitants in an area of 595 km^{2} (230 sq mi), and its capital city is San Cosme.

== Settlements ==
- Paso de la Patria
- San Cosme
- Santa Ana
