= University of Rouen Normandy =

French university

Coordinates: 49.460001°N 1.067002°E

- Université de Rouen Normandie
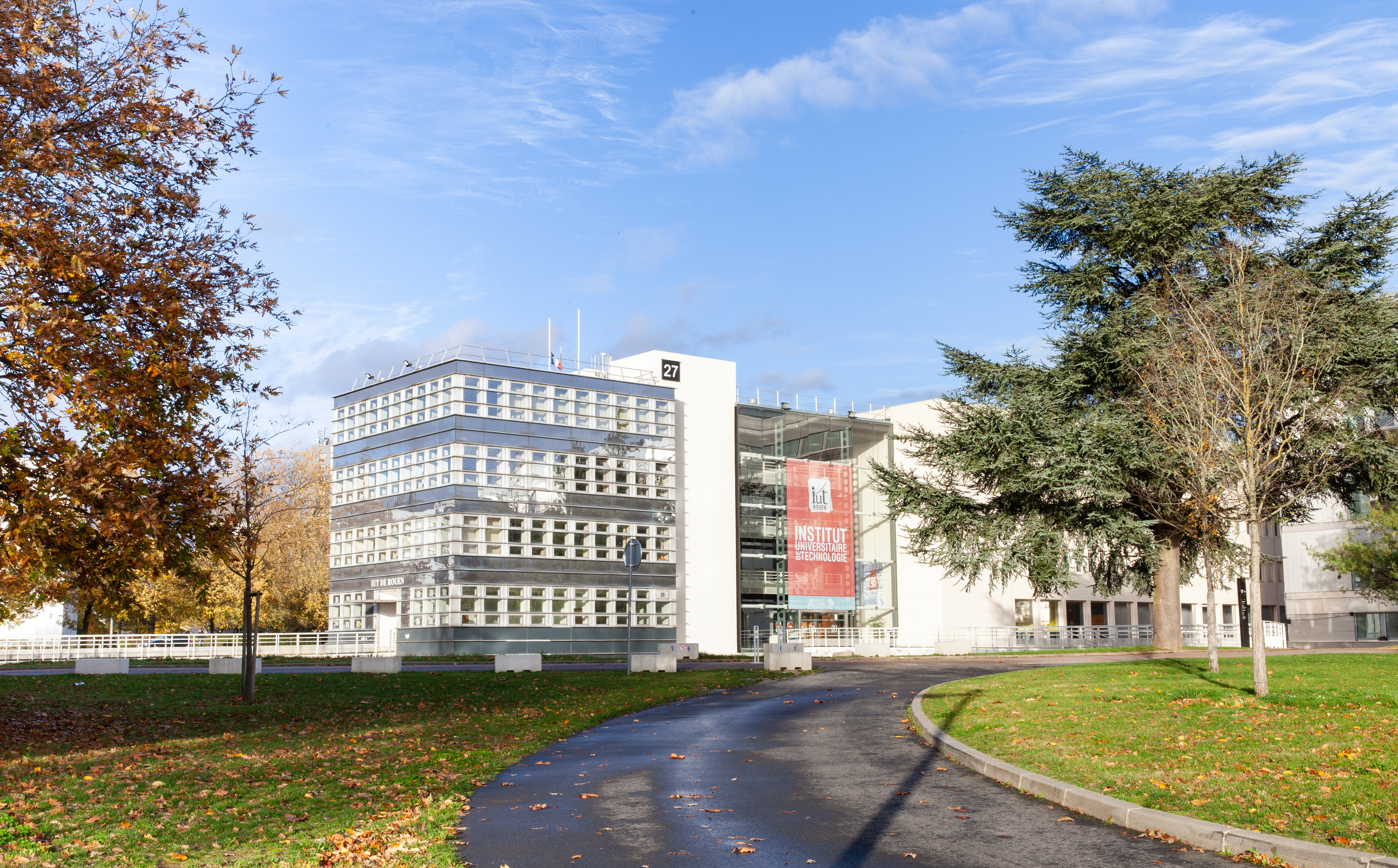
- Type: Public
- Established: 1966
- President: Joël Alexandre
- Students: 28,997
- Undergraduates: 14,601
- Postgraduates: 4,843
- Doctoral students: 769
- Location: Rouen, France
- Website: http://www.univ-rouen.fr/ (in French)
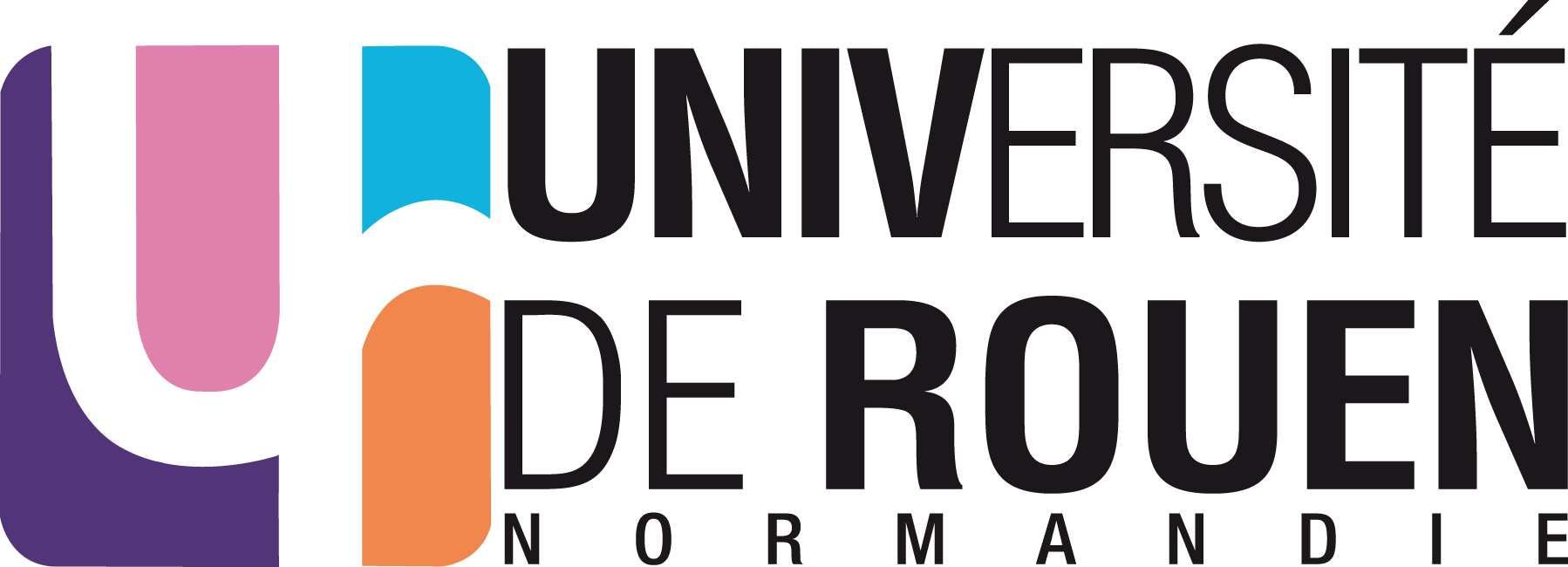

The University of Rouen Normandy (Université de Rouen Normandie) is a French university, in the Academy of Rouen.

== History and demographics ==
Located not in Rouen, but in the suburb of Mont-Saint-Aignan (a "township" in the Normandy region), the University of Rouen Normandy opened in 1966 as an off-shoot of the University of Caen. It is a large public university with over 25,000 students enrolled.

== Ranking ==
According to U.S. News & World Report, University of Rouen Normandy made #835 (in a 3-way tie with Assiut University in Egypt and Universidad de Antioquia in Colombia) on the Best Global Universities list (published October 24, 2017) out of 1,250 universities being judged. University of Rouen Normandy was also compared to 66 other French universities and was ranked #45. These rankings are based on the reputation of the university as well as the extent and quality of the research performed at each location.

== Achievements ==
- First transcatheter aortic valve implantation in the world performed by Prof. Alain Cribier in 2002.

== Housing ==
Students do not live on campus at University of Rouen Normandy, as housing is not available through the university. Nearby apartments are available and booked through the state agency CROUS.

The University of Rouen Normandy takes part in the XL-Chem Graduate School of Research project, funded by the State via the National Research Agency.

== Notable people ==
Faculty

- Carlo Giuseppe Guglielmo Botta (1766–1837) - Italian historian; university rector
- Paul Rollin (1932, in Bordeaux – 2003) - university president
- Michel Thellier (born 1933, in Arcueil) - plant physiologist.
- André Vauchez (born 1938, in Thionville) - medievalist specialising in the history of Christian spirituality.
- Annie Ernaux (born 1940) - Nobel Prize-winning (2022) French writer and professor of literature.
- Claude Dellacherie (born 1943, in Lauwin-Planque) - mathematician, specialising in probability theory
- Alain Cribier (born 1945) - cardiologist
- Jacques Legrand (born 1946, in Rennes) - linguist and anthropologist; specialist in Mongolian literature, history and language
- Dominique Perrin (born 1946) - mathematician and computer scientist
- Catherine Virlouvet (born 1956) - historian of Ancient Rome
- Loïc Vadelorge (born 1964) - historian
- Catriona Seth (born 1964) - British scholar of French literature and the history of ideas
- Pierre Cosme (born 1965) - historian specialising in ancient Rome

Alumni

- Robert Lecourt (1908 in Pavilly - 2004) - member of French resistance; lawyer; President of the European Court of Justice
- Olga Kosakiewicz (1915 in Kiev – 1983) - theatre actress
- Paul Sebag (Tunisian Arabic: پول صباغ), born 1919, in Tunis - 2004, in Paris) - French-Tunisian sociologist and historian
- Michel Bercovier (Hebrew: מישל ברקוביאר; born 1941, in Lyon) - French-Israeli computer scientist
- Maxime Crochemore (born 1947) - computer scientist
- Jean-Pierre Florens (born 1947, in Marseille) - economist
- Django Sissoko (1948–2022) - Prime Minister of Mali 2012–2013
- Christian Gouriéroux (born 1949) - econometrician
- Justine Mintsa (born 1949, in Oyem, Gambia) - writer
- Yaou Aïssatou (born 1951) - Minister of Women's Affairs, Cameroon
- Sheila Copps (born 1952, in Hamilton, Ontario) - Canadian politician; Deputy Prime Minister of Canada (1993–1997)
- Pascal Morand (born 1955 in Neuilly-sur-Seine) - economist; Executive President of the Fédération française de la couture
- Habib Abdulrab Sarori (born 1956) - Yemeni computer scientist and novelist
- Catherine Morin-Desailly (born 1960, in Le Petit-Quevilly, Seine-Maritime) - politician (UDI)
- Lama Salam (born 1961) - Lebanese activist
- Christian Robert (born 1961) - statistician, specialising in Bayesian statistics
- Laurent Ruquier (born 1963, in Le Havre) - television presenter, radio host and comedian
- Agnès Firmin-Le Bodo (born 1968, in Le Havre) - pharmacist and politician (Horizons)
- Emmanuel Maquet (born 1968, in Dieppe) - politician (LR)
- Christophe Bouillon (born 1969, in Rouen) - politician (PS)
- Stéphan Perreau (born 1969) - musician and art historian
- Raphaëlle Branche (born 1972) - historian
- Audrey Pulvar (born 1972, in Martinique) - journalist, television and radio host and politician (PS)
- David Cormand (born 1974) - politician (EELV)
- Sira Sylla (born 1980) - politician of (LREM)

Recipient of honorary degree

- Orhan Pamuk (born 1952) - Turkish novelist, screenwriter, academic

== See also ==
- List of public universities in France by academy
- Media related to University of Rouen at Wikimedia Commons
