= FreeFem++ =

Programming and software language

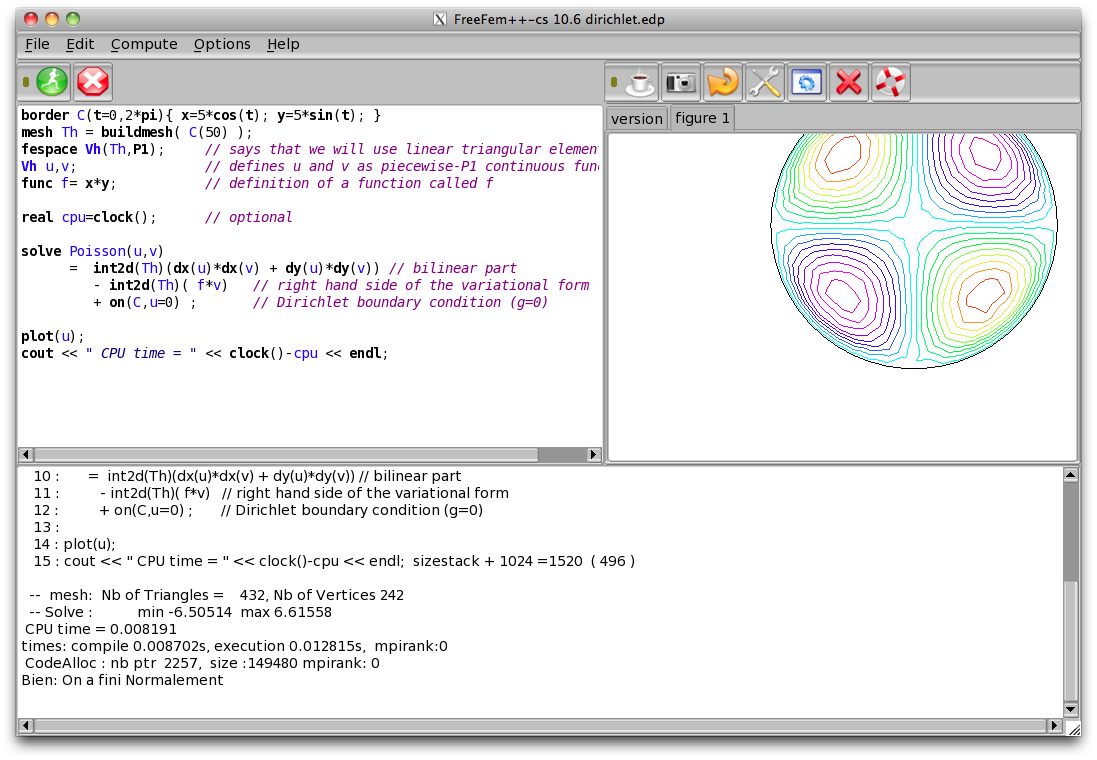
- FreeFem++-cs
- Developers: Université Pierre et Marie Curie and Laboratoire Jacques-Louis Lions
- Release: 1987; 39 years ago
- Stable release: 4.17 / July 13, 2026; 2 months ago
- Written in: C++
- Operating system: Linux, macOS, Microsoft Windows, Solaris
- License: LGPL version 2.1 or later
- Website: freefem.org
- Repository: github.com/FreeFem/FreeFem-sources

FreeFem++ is a programming language and a software focused on solving partial differential equations using the finite element method. FreeFem++ is written in C++ and developed and maintained by Université Pierre et Marie Curie and Laboratoire Jacques-Louis Lions. It runs on Linux, Solaris, macOS and Microsoft Windows systems. FreeFem++ is free software (LGPL).

FreeFem++ language is inspired by C++. There is an IDE called FreeFem++-cs.

== History ==
The first version was created in 1987 by Olivier Pironneau and was named MacFem (it only worked on Macintosh); PCFem appeared some time later. Both were written in Pascal.

In 1992 it was re-written in C++ and named FreeFem. Later versions, FreeFem+ (1996) and FreeFem++ (1998), used that programming language too.

== Other versions ==
- FreeFem++ includes versions for console mode and MPI
- FreeFem3D

Deprecated versions:

- FreeFem+
- FreeFem

== See also ==
- List of finite element software packages
