= Yaou Aïssatou =

Cameroonian politician

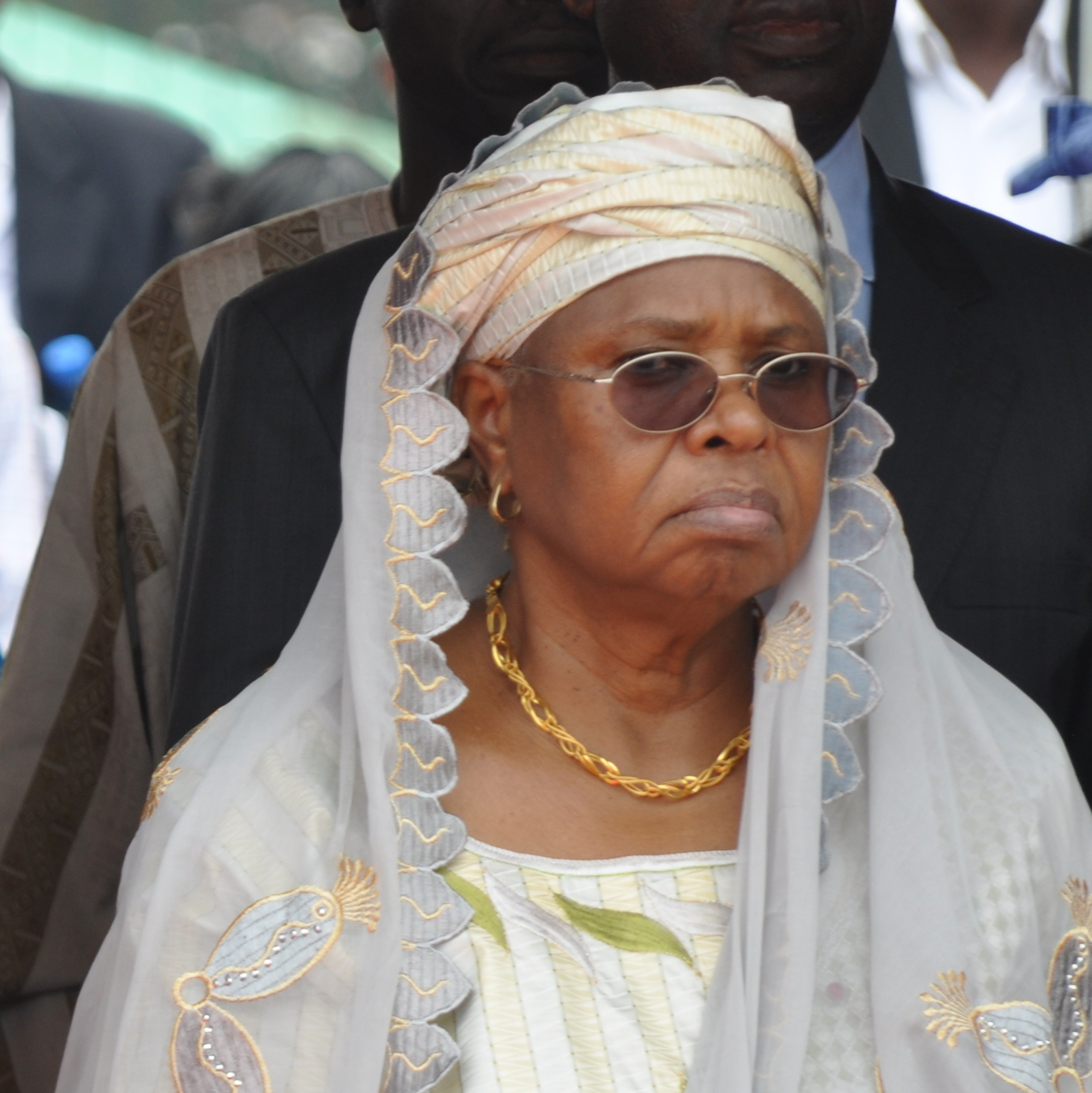
- Born: November 28, 1951 (age 74); Tcheboa
- Known for: Cameroon minister

Yaou Aïssatou (born 28 November 1951) is the Director General of Cameroon's National Investment Corporation (NIS). She was also Cameroon's first Minister of Women's Affairs.

== Early life ==
Aïssatou is the daughter of the lamido of Tchéboa in Cameroon's North Region, where she attended high school. She went on to the Lycée Technique in Douala, where she obtained a baccalaureate in 1971. After her graduation she studied economics at the University of Rouen in France, obtaining a BA degree in 1975. She served with the NIS back in Cameroon for a short time before moving to the United States to study at Georgetown University and Claremont Graduate School, graduating with an MBA.

== Career ==
On returning to Cameroon in 1979 she rejoined the NIS as its Deputy Director of Finance. In February 1984 she was given her first ministerial position as Cameroon's first Minister of Women's Affairs. She replaced Delphine Zanga Tsogo in March 1985 as president of the national office of the Women's Organization of the ruling Cameroon People's Democratic Movement, and she was promoted in May 1988 to the role of Minister of Social and Women's Affairs, serving until April 2000. In 2009 she was appointed by presidential decree as the new head of the NIS, replacing Esther Dang Belibi who had resigned in an angry dispute.
