= San Cosme, Corrientes =

San Cosme Sán Kósme
- Town
- Location of San Cosme in Argentina
- Coordinates: 27°31′S 58°34′W
- Country: Argentina
- Province: Corrientes
- Department: San Cosme
- Elevation: 56 m (184 ft)

Population
  - Total: 4,429
- Time zone: UTC−3 (ART)
- CPA base: W3412
- Dialing code: +54 3783

San Cosme (Guarani: Sán Kósme) is a town in Corrientes Province, Argentina. It is the capital of San Cosme Department.

From 1912 until 1927 San Cosme had a railway station on a branch line of the Ferrocarril Económico Correntino narrow gauge railway.
