= Cosme de Villiers =

French Carmelite bibliographer

Cosme de Villiers de Saint Étienne

Personal life
- Born: 1683 Saint-Denis, France
- Died: 1758 (aged 74–75) Orléans, France
- Notable work: Bibliotheca carmelitana (1752)

Religious life
- Religion: Roman Catholic
- Order: Carmelite

Senior posting
- Post: Orléans

Cosme de Villiers de Saint Étienne (1683–1758) was a French Carmelite bibliographer.

== Life ==
Born in Saint-Denis, near Paris, he joined the Carmelite order and from 1709 to 1727 was lecturer in philosophy or theology in various convents of the order, particularly Nantes, Hennebont, and Saint-Pol-de-Léon. In 1727, Villiers began to preach. He later became a preacher in Orléans, where he died.

== Works ==
He was the author of the Bibliotheca carmelitana (2 vols, Orleans, 1752).

== Sources ==
- Dictionnaire historique et bibliographique, vol. 2 (Paris, 1822), 64.
- Dictionnaire historique; ou, Biographie universelle classique, vol. 6 (Paris, 1829), 3239.
