= Transcatheter aortic valve replacement =

Aortic valve implantation technique

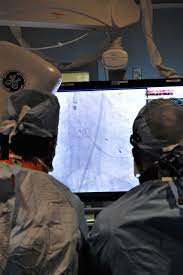
- Interventional Cardiologist positioning a TAVI device in patient.
- Other names: Transcatheter aortic valve implantation, TAVI
- Specialty: Interventional cardiology
- Complications: Stroke risk is 4-5% higher in the high-risk patients compared to SAVR
- Outcomes: Successful rate: 92%.

Transcatheter aortic valve replacement (TAVR), or transcatheter aortic valve implantation (TAVI), is the implantation of a replacement for the aortic valve through the blood vessels and into the heart, without removing the native valve. TAVR is an alternative to surgical aortic valve replacement (SAVR), which requires open heart surgery. TAVR procedure is used to treat severe aortic stenosis. The first TAVI was performed on 16 April 2002 by Alain Cribier. The implanted valve is delivered via one of several access methods: transfemoral (in the upper leg), transapical (through the wall of the heart), subclavian (beneath the collar bone), direct aortic (through a minimally invasive surgical incision into the aorta), and transcaval (from a temporary hole in the aorta near the navel through a vein in the upper leg), among others.

Severe symptomatic aortic stenosis carries a poor prognosis. At present, there is no treatment via medication, making the timing of aortic valve replacement the most important decision to make for these patients. Until recently, surgical aortic valve replacement was the standard treatment for adults with severe symptomatic aortic stenosis. However, the risks associated with surgical aortic valve replacement are increased in elderly patients and those with concomitant severe systolic heart failure or coronary artery disease, as well as in people with comorbidities such as cerebrovascular and peripheral arterial disease, chronic kidney disease, and chronic respiratory dysfunction.

== Overview ==
Patients with symptomatic severe aortic stenosis have a mortality rate of approximately 50% at 2 years without intervention. In patients who are deemed too high risk for open heart surgery, TAVI significantly reduces the rates of death and cardiac symptoms. Until about 2017 TAVI was not routinely recommended for low-risk patients in favor of aortic valve replacement, however it is increasingly being offered to intermediate risk patients, based on studies finding that it is not inferior to surgical aortic valve replacement.

Transapical TAVI is reserved for patients for whom other approaches are not feasible: an evidence-based BMJ Rapid Recommendation made a strong recommendation against transapical TAVI in people who are also candidates for either transfemoral TAVI or surgery. People who have the option of either transfemoral TAVI or surgical replacement are likely to choose surgery if they are younger than 75 and transfemoral TAVI if they are older than 75. The rationale for age-based recommendations is that surgical aortic valve replacements are known to be durable long-term (average of durability of 20 years), so people with longer life expectancy would be at higher risk if TAVI durability is worse than surgery.

== Devices ==
Medtronic's CoreValve Transcatheter Aortic Valve is constructed of a self-expanding Nitinol (nickel titanium) frame and delivered through the femoral artery. This device received FDA approval in January 2014.

Boston Scientific's Lotus Valve system was awarded CE mark approval in October 2013. It allows the final position to be assessed and evaluated before release and has been designed to minimise regurgitation. Boston Scientific has since retired the device as of January 11, 2021. This was primarily due to difficulty regarding the ability to reposition and recapture the valve.

St Jude Medical's Portico Transcatheter aortic valve received European CE mark approval in December 2013. The valve is repositionable before release to ensure accurate placement helping to improve patient outcomes.

Edwards' Sapien aortic valve is made from bovine pericardial tissue and is implanted via a catheter-based delivery system. It is approved by the FDA for use in the US.

== Implantation ==
The devices are implanted without open heart surgery. The valve delivery system is inserted in the body, the valve is positioned and then implanted inside the diseased aortic valve, and then the delivery system is removed. The catheter-based delivery system can be inserted into the body from one of several sites. Pre-procedural planning includes aortic valve annulus measurements and possible procedural complication likelihood. The standard for preoperative plans is to perform a multi-detector computed angiotomography (MDCT), which delivers the information required. Magnetic resonance imaging (MRI) and 3D echocardiography is an alternative.

=== Transfemoral approach ===
The transfemoral approach requires the catheter and valve to be inserted via the femoral artery. Similar to coronary artery stenting procedures, this is accessed via a small incision in the groin, through which the delivery system is slowly fed along the artery to the correct position at the aortic valve. A larger incision in the groin may be required in some circumstances. The femoral artery (via transfemoral approach) is the traditional access for percutaneous aortic valve implantation.

=== Transapical approach ===
The transapical approach sees the catheter and valve inserted through the tip of the heart and into the left ventricle. Under general anesthesia, a small surgical incision is made between the ribs, followed by a small puncture of the heart. The delivery system is then fed slowly to the correct position at the aortic valve. The puncture in the heart is then sutured shut.

=== Transaortic approach ===
The transaortic approach sees the catheter and valve inserted through the top of the right chest. Under general anesthesia, a small surgical incision is made alongside the right upper breastbone, followed by a small puncture of the aorta. The delivery system is then fed slowly to the correct position at the aortic valve. The hole in the aorta is then sutured shut.

=== Transcaval approach ===
The transcaval approach has been applied to a smaller number of patients who are not eligible for transfemoral, transapical, or transaortic approaches. In the transcaval approach a tube is inserted via the femoral vein instead of the femoral artery, and a small wire is used to cross from the inferior vena cava into the adjacent abdominal aorta. Once the wire is across, a large tube is used to place the transcatheter heart valve through the femoral vein and inferior vena cava into the aorta and from there the heart. This otherwise resembles the transfemoral approach. Afterwards, the hole in the aorta is closed with a self-collapsing nitinol device designed to close holes in the heart.

=== Subclavian approach ===
In the subclavian approach, an incision is made under the collarbone under general anesthesia, and the delivery system is advanced into the correct position in the aortic valve. The delivery system is then removed and the incision is sutured closed.

== After-care ==
Regular medical checkups and imaging tests are required after TAVI.

The Mayo Clinic says that blood thinners (anticoagulants) are prescribed to prevent blood clots after TAVI. Sources suggest that antithrombotic therapy following TAVR varies based on patient characteristics: in patients without any clear indications for anticoagulation, single antiplatelet therapy (aspirin) is recommended as it lowers bleeding risk without increasing ischemic events, while in patients with indications for anticoagulation, oral anticoagulation without any adjunctive medication is preferred. Artificial heart valves are susceptible to bacterial infection; most bacteria that cause heart valve infections come from the mouth, so that good dental hygiene and routine dental cleaning are recommended. Antibiotics are prescribed for use before certain dental procedures.

New or worse post-procedure symptoms that require attention include dizziness or light-headedness, swelling of the ankles, sudden weight gain, extreme fatigue with activity, and signs of infection. Emergency attention is required for chest pain, pressure or tightness, severe, sudden shortness of breath, or fainting.

== Complications ==
The orientation, uniformity and depth of the valve is important. When the valve is not inserted correctly, there can be incomplete sealing between the native heart valve and the stented valve, leading to paravalvular leak (PVL). Key properties associated with paravalvular leak are the regurgitation volume, the PVL orifice location (anterior or posterior) and the associated fluid dynamic effects that occur from the interactions between the regurgitated flow and the normal transmitral flow.

Morisawa et al. carried out quantitative research to determine how the PVL flow affected normal transmitral flow based on three different in-vitro situations: no PVL, anterior orifice PVL and posterior orifice PVL. The results showed that while the two PVL cases worsened the fluid dynamics of the normal transmitral flow seen without leakage, the posterior orifice PVL was worse, leading to a higher circulation and kinetic energy, requiring the heart to work harder and consume more energy to maintain normal bodily functions.

Additionally, the "Big 5 of TAVI complications" include paravalvular leakage (PVL), major bleeding or vascular complications, acute kidney injury (AKI), stroke, and conduction abnormalities, such as high-degree AV-block with need for permanent pacemaker implantation must be monitored to ensure successful procedural outcomes such as low mortality and morbidity.

There is a ~3% risk of stroke associated with TAVI due to embolism or altered hemodynamics during or after the procedure. Approximately 70% of patients undergoing TAVI show signs of clinically silent brain infarcts on neuroimaging afterwards. Further, levels of the neuroaxonal damage biomarker neurofilament light chain are elevated in blood plasma after TAVI. Whereas clinical stroke is associated with reduced quality of life and cognitive impairment, the significance of silent brain infarcts and elevated levels of neurofilament light is presently unclear.

== Prognosis ==
According to the 2021 ESC/EACTS Guidelines for the management of valvular heart disease, TAVI should be considered for patients who are 75 years or older or at high surgical risk (STS-PROM/EuroSCORE II > 8%).

Surgical aortic valve replacements are known for their long-term durability (average life expectancy of 20 years), so individuals with a longer life expectancy would be more at risk if TAVI's durability were less than surgery. Transcatheter valve durability is not known at the moment. The major randomized studies published over the past decade are as follows:

- PARTNER 1A study, the first randomized trial published in Lancet in 2015, enrolling 699 patients, demonstrated that TAVI is an alternative to traditional surgery for patients with severe aortic stenosis and high surgical risk after an average follow up of 5 years.
- The COREVALVE study, a randomized trial published in 2018 in the Journal of the American College of Cardiology, with an enrollment of 797 patients with severe aortic stenosis and high surgical risk, showed a similar rate of survival and stroke after 5 years after TAVI and surgery.
- PARTNER 2A, a randomized trial published in the New England Journal of Medicine in 2020, enrolled 2,032 patients with severe aortic stenosis and intermediate surgical risk. There was no difference between the death and stroke rates between patients who underwent TAVI and those who underwent traditional surgery after 5 years.
- In SURTAVI, a randomized trial published in JAMA Cardiology in 2022, 1660 patients were enrolled with severe aortic stenosis and intermediate surgical risk. This study found similar outcomes after five years between TAVI and surgery, but TAVI patients had a higher risk of pacemaker implantation.
- The PARTNER 3 study, a randomized trial published in the New England Journal of Medicine in 2023, included 1000 patients with severe aortic stenosis and low surgical risk. It revealed no significant difference at 5 years between TAVI or surgery patients.
- The EVOLUT study, a randomized trial published in 2024 in the Journal of Thoracic and Cardiovascular Surgery, enrolled 1,414 patients with severe aortic stenosis and low surgical risk. Patients who underwent TAVI had better outcomes for mortality and stroke than patients who underwent surgery over the course of 4 years.
- A 10-year follow-up on the NOTION study published in the European Heart Journal in 2024 is the longest ever. A total of 280 patients with severe aortic stenosis and low surgical risk were randomized to either TAVI or surgical aortic replacement. Based on the results of this randomized trial, the outcomes of both patients undergoing the 2 procedures were similar in terms of all-cause mortality, stroke and myocardial infarction.

A meta-analysis of these randomized trials, realized by INTEGRITTY, found that TAVI provides a protective effect in the short term, but after two years when surgery becomes more effective, the benefit disappears. TAVI has shown positive short-term results due to its less invasive procedure and lower complication rate. However, there isn't enough follow-up data on TAVI to confirm these results.

In the meta-analysis, examining death from any cause or stroke, the hazard ratio analysis shows that TAVI is superior to aortic surgery for the first 6 months following the procedure; this advantage decreases over time, and at 2 years, aortic surgery is superior.

A landmark analysis indicates that patients who undergo TAVI in the first six months after the procedure are unlikely to be hospitalized again. Patients undergoing aortic surgery are more likely to undergo rehospitalization at a higher rate than patients undergoing TAVI beyond 6 months.

=== Recovery ===
Within 24 hours post-operation, patients are encouraged to be walking. It is common for patients to have an overnight hospital stay post operatively. Follow-up examinations (Chest X-ray, EKG, and Cardiac US) ensure heart functioning. Incision sites are monitored closely. Pts. are encouraged not to drive for 72 hours post operatively, and to avoid physical activity for up to 10 days. Most patients resume activity within 2 weeks.

A 2018 study that interviewed nineteen elderly patients six months after a transapical TAVI procedure found that participants felt weak and tired at first after TAVI, some more than before the procedure. Some reported a later "surprisingly simple rehabilitation" with rapid recovery, while others had a "demanding rehabilitation", with slow recovery, fatigue, and weakness.

=== Durability ===
The durability of transcatheter prostheses, in terms of all-cause mortality and the need of re-intervention, was not reliably known as of 2021 due to the lack of long-term follow-up data. A narrative review published in 2021 reported that a 2015 study involving simulation on first-generation prostheses suggested a TAVI durability limited to 7–8 years. Later prostheses have improved durability.

Bioprosthetic valve dysfunction (BVD) has historically been divided into SVD (structural valve deterioration, including irreversible intrinsic changes of the prosthetic valve structure), NSVD (non-structural valve deterioration, including irreversible intra- or para-prosthetic regurgitation, prosthesis malposition, and patient-prosthesis mismatch), valve thrombosis, and endocarditis (which can be potentially reversible). Durability seems to be similar between TAVI and surgical implantation (SAVR), but there is a lack of long-term data, with only computed simulation models available. In many respects TAVI and SAVR are comparable, but TAVI still has a higher rate of NSVD. In elderly patients the prostheses should outlive the patient. The 2021 review suggested that in younger patients (with longer average life expectancy) choosing TAVI might still be premature, due to the increased likelihood of the need for future re-operation with worse prognostic impact.

== History ==
The catheter procedure was invented and developed in Aarhus University Hospital Denmark in 1989 by Henning Rud Andersen, who performed the first animal implantations that year.

The first implantation in a human was performed on 16 April 2002 by Alain Cribier in Hopital Charles Nicolle, at the University of Rouen, France. Technology experts Stan Rowe and Stan Rabinowitz partnered with physicians Alain Cribier and Martin Leon of NewYork–Presbyterian / Columbia and others to create the company Percutaneous Valve Technologies (PVT) in 2002.

The company was purchased by Edwards Lifesciences in 2004; its valve became the Sapien valve. It was the first aortic valve device to receive FDA approval, in November 2011 for use in inoperable patients and in October 2012 for use in patients at high surgical risk. The device is effective in improving functioning in patients with severe aortic stenosis. It is now approved in more than 50 countries.

The Rolling Stones' Mick Jagger had the procedure in March 2019 at NewYork–Presbyterian, which was said to have raised public awareness.
