= Oliver Hankinson =

British-born American toxicologist and academic

- Born: 1946 (age 79–80); Reading, Berkshire, England
- Education: University of Edinburgh (B.Sc.); University of Cambridge (Ph.D.)
- Known for: Introducing mammalian cell genetics into toxicology; elucidating molecular mechanisms of environmental pollutants and hypoxia
- Awards: Fellow of the American Association for the Advancement of Science (2013); Society of Toxicology Distinguished Toxicology Scholar Award (2011); Society of Toxicology Education Award (2019)
- Scientific career
- Fields: Toxicology, Molecular Biology, Pathology
- Workplaces: University of California, Los Angeles

Oliver Hankinson (born 1946) is a British-born American toxicologist and academic. He is a Distinguished Research Professor of Pathology and Laboratory Medicine and of Environmental Health Sciences at the University of California, Los Angeles (UCLA). He is the founding and current chair of UCLA's Interdepartmental Doctoral Program in Molecular Toxicology. He is recognized for introducing mammalian cell genetics into the study of toxicology and for his pioneering investigations into the mechanisms by which environmental pollutants cause toxic and carcinogenic effects, as well as the role of organisms' adaptations to low oxygen (hypoxia).

== Early life and education ==
Hankinson was born in 1946 in Reading, Berkshire, England, and attended Sir William Borlase's Grammar School in Marlow, Buckinghamshire. He studied genetics at the University of Edinburgh, graduating in 1967 with a B.Sc. with First Class Honours summa cum laude in three rather than the usual four years. From 1967 to 1969 he taught high school science in Tanzania through Voluntary Service Overseas, the U.K. equivalent of the Peace Corps. He earned a Ph.D. in genetics at the University of Cambridge in 1972. Hankinson then pursued postdoctoral training at Harvard Medical School (1972–74), the University of Colorado Medical Center (1974–75), and the Department of Molecular Biology at the University of California, Berkeley (1975–79), where he worked under Nobel laureate Donald A. Glaser.

== Career ==
Hankinson joined the UCLA faculty in 1979 as an Assistant Professor of Pathology, later becoming full professor and, in 2016, Distinguished Research Professor. He holds appointments in the Department of Pathology and Laboratory Medicine at the David Geffen School of Medicine and in the Department of Environmental Health Sciences at the UCLA Fielding School of Public Health.

At UCLA, he has served in multiple leadership roles, including vice chair for research in the Department of Pathology and Laboratory Medicine (1997–2003) and director of the Viral and Chemical Carcinogenesis Program at the Jonsson Comprehensive Cancer Center (1994–2003). In 2000, he founded the UCLA Interdepartmental Doctoral Program in Environmental and Molecular Toxicology, which he continues to chair. Since 2008, he has also been principal investigator and founding director of UCLA's NIH-funded training program in Molecular Toxicology.

== Research ==
Hankinson's career has centered on elucidating the molecular mechanisms by which environmental pollutants and endogenous signals regulate gene expression, carcinogenesis, and adaptation to hypoxia. His work has integrated mammalian cell genetics, molecular biology, and toxicology, and has made contributions to the understanding of how cells sense and respond to chemicals and oxygen.

In the late 1970s, Hankinson pioneered the use of mammalian cell genetics to study toxicology. He designed a single-step selection procedure to isolate clones of mouse hepatoma cells resistant to the toxicity of benzo[a]pyrene, a polycyclic aromatic hydrocarbon (PAH). These mutants lacked inducibility of the enzyme CYP1A1 and provided critical early evidence that the toxic effects of PAHs were mediated by the aryl hydrocarbon receptor (AHR). Further analysis demonstrated that the mutations could be grouped into multiple complementation classes, one mapping to the AHR gene itself and others to genes required for AHR function. His laboratory also identified CYP1A1 mutants that were constitutive for CYP1A1 expression, which provided one of the first indications that the AHR could be activated by endogenous or nutritional ligands. The "Hepa-1" mutant system developed in his group has since been widely used by other researchers investigating AHR and hypoxia-inducible pathways.

Building on these genetic studies, Hankinson's group cloned the human "C gene", later named the aryl hydrocarbon receptor nuclear translocator (ARNT). They showed that ARNT forms a heterodimer with AHR on DNA, thereby initiating transcription of pollutant-responsive genes such as CYP1A1. This discovery marked a paradigm shift in toxicology and transcriptional biology: ARNT was the first mammalian representative of a new family of transcription factors, the basic helix–loop–helix/Per–ARNT–Sim (bHLH-PAS) proteins. Soon after, AHR itself was cloned and shown to be a bHLH-PAS protein. Work from Hankinson's laboratory and others subsequently defined the functional domains of AHR and ARNT, including the structural bases of dimerization, DNA binding, ligand binding and interaction with other regulatory proteins.

Hankinson extended these discoveries to the study of cellular responses to oxygen mediated by hypoxia-inducible factor-1 (HIF-1), the master regulator of the hypoxic response, which had been shown to be a dimer of ARNT and a novel bHLH-PAS protein, HIF-1α. In collaboration with Peter J. Ratcliffe, his laboratory provided the first definitive evidence that HIF-1 is required for hypoxic induction of genes in their native chromosomal context, and that the HIF-1 pathway is essential for the growth and vascularization of solid tumors. ARNT knockout mice generated in his laboratory showed that the protein is indispensable for placental development, thereby linking transcriptional regulation to embryogenesis and reproduction. These contributions formed part of the broader body of work on hypoxia sensing for which William Kaelin, Peter Ratcliffe, and Gregg Semenza received the 2019 Nobel Prize in Physiology or Medicine.

Hankinson's laboratory also characterized how transcriptional coactivators facilitate AHR/ARNT and HIF-1α/ARNT signaling. His group demonstrated roles for histone acetyltransferases, chromatin remodeling complexes, Mediator subunits and other regulatory proteins required for both dioxin and hypoxia responses, establishing that ARNT serves as a common hub for multiple signaling pathways. This work revealed new principles of transcriptional regulation, including noncanonical recruitment of cofactors to the PAS and helix domains, and highlighted the molecular overlap between toxicological and physiological responses.

More recently, Hankinson has employed genome-wide approaches to expand the understanding of AHR signaling. His group used RNA interference and CRISPR/Cas9 screens to identify genes required for AHR-dependent induction of CYP1A1, uncovering both expected players (AHR, ARNT, CYP1A1) and novel factors such as Sin3A. They further demonstrated that activation of AHR/ARNT transcriptional activity alters the metabolism of omega-3 and omega-6 polyunsaturated fatty acids (PUFAs), leading to the production of epoxides with opposing effects on tumor growth and metastasis.

== Awards and honors ==
- 1972–1974 – Leukemia Society of America Postdoctoral Fellowship
- 1972 – Damon Runyon Cancer Research Foundation Postdoctoral Fellowship (declined)
- 1990–1991 – Associated Western Universities/Department of Energy Distinguished Lecturer
- 2011 – Society of Toxicology Distinguished Toxicology Scholar Award on the 50th anniversary of SOT
- 2013 – Elected a Fellow of the American Association for the Advancement of Science
- 2019 – Society of Toxicology Education Award

== Selected publications ==
- Hankinson, O. (1995). "The Aryl Hydrocarbon Receptor Complex". Annual Review of Pharmacology and Toxicology. 35: 307–340. doi:10.1146/annurev.pa.35.040195.001515. PMID 7598497.
- Hoffman, Emily C.; Reyes, Herminio; Chu, Fong-Fong; Sander, Fred; Conley, Linda H.; Brooks, Barbara A.; Hankinson, Oliver (1991). "Cloning of a Factor Required for Activity of the Ah (Dioxin) Receptor". Science. 252 (5008): 954–958. Bibcode:1991Sci...252..954H. doi:10.1126/science.1852076. PMID 1852076.
- Reyes, Herminio; Reisz-Porszasz, Suzanne; Hankinson, Oliver (1992). "Identification of the Ah Receptor Nuclear Translocator Protein (Arnt) as a Component of the DNA Binding Form of the Ah Receptor". Science. 256 (5060): 1193–1195. Bibcode:1992Sci...256.1193R. doi:10.1126/science.256.5060.1193. PMID 1317062.
- Maxwell, P. H.; Dachs, G. U.; Gleadle, J. M.; Nicholls, L. G.; Harris, A. L.; Stratford, I. J.; Hankinson, O.; Pugh, C. W.; Ratcliffe, P. J. (1997). "Hypoxia-inducible factor-1 modulates gene expression in solid tumors and influences both angiogenesis and tumor growth". Proceedings of the National Academy of Sciences. 94 (15): 8104–8109. Bibcode:1997PNAS...94.8104M. doi:10.1073/pnas.94.15.8104. PMC 21564. PMID 9223322.
- Hankinson, Oliver (2005). "Role of coactivators in transcriptional activation by the aryl hydrocarbon receptor". Archives of Biochemistry and Biophysics. 433 (2): 379–386. Bibcode:2005ArBB..433..379H. doi:10.1016/j.abb.2004.09.031. PMID 15581594.
- Huerta-Yepez, Sara; Tirado-Rodriguez, Ana; Montecillo-Aguado, Mayra R.; Yang, Jun; Hammock, Bruce D.; Hankinson, Oliver (2020). "Aryl Hydrocarbon Receptor-Dependent inductions of omega-3 and omega-6 polyunsaturated fatty acid metabolism act inversely on tumor progression". Scientific Reports. 10 7843. Bibcode:2020NatSR..10.7843H. doi:10.1038/s41598-020-64146-6. PMC 7217871.
