= Hypoxia-inducible factor dioxygenase =

Hypoxia-inducible factor dioxygenase may refer to:

- Hypoxia-inducible factor-proline dioxygenase
- Hypoxia-inducible factor-asparagine dioxygenase
