= Grand Prix scientifique de la Fondation Lefoulon-Delalande =

- Awarded for: Award in the area of cardiology
- Sponsored by: Institut de France
- Country: France
- Reward: €600,000
- First award: 2000
- Website: Official website

The Grand Prix scientifique de la Fondation Lefoulon-Delalande (Scientific Grand Prize of the Lefoulon-Delalande Foundation) is an award conferred annually by the Lefoulon-Delalande Foundation at the Institut de France. It is awarded in the areas of medical science, particularly cardiovascular science. Each year the prize has a different theme. The award has a €600,000 prize.

== Laureates ==
Winners of the prize are:

Year	Winner(s)
2024	Kathryn J Moore, Christopher Glass
2018	Helen Hobbs, Catherine Boileau, Nabil Seidah
2017	Alain Cribier
2016	Elisabetta Dejana and Elisabeth Tournier-Lasserve
2015	Albert Starr
2014	Adolfo J. de Bold
2013	Carlo Patrono and Garret A. FitzGerald
2012	William G. Kaelin, Peter J. Ratcliffe and Gregg L. Semenza
2011	Valentín Fuster
2010	Michel Haïssaguerre
2009	Eric Olson
2008	Dario Di Francesco
2007	Christine Seidman and Jonathan Seidman
2006	Francis Fontan and Philipp Bonhoeffer
2005	Harold F. Dvorak, Napoleone Ferrara and Moses Judah Folkman
2004	Attilio Maseri
2003	Robert J. Lefkowitz
2002	Salvador Moncada
