= Carolyn Kaelin =

American physician

- Born: Carolyn Mary Scerbo; April 4, 1961; Syracuse, New York, U.S.
- Died: July 28, 2015 (aged 54); Charlestown, Massachusetts, U.S.
- Education: Smith College (BA); Johns Hopkins University (MD); Harvard University (MPH)
- Scientific career
- Fields: Surgical oncology Breast cancer
- Institutions: Brigham and Women's Hospital; Dana–Farber Cancer Institute

Carolyn Kaelin (born Carolyn Mary Scerbo; April 4, 1961 – July 28, 2015) was an American cancer surgeon. She worked at the Dana–Farber Cancer Institute and founded the Comprehensive Breast Health Center at Brigham and Women’s Hospital in 1995.

== Early life and education ==
Carolyn Kaelin was born in Syracuse, New York, to Mary (née Zebrowski) and Richard Scerbo. She was raised in Franklin Lakes, New Jersey, and graduated from Indian Hills High School in Oakland, New Jersey, in 1979. She studied biochemistry and economics at Smith College. She earned her medical degree from the Johns Hopkins School of Medicine. Kaelin also earned a master's degree from the Harvard T.H. Chan School of Public Health. During her residency, she earned an award for chief resident of the year.

== Career ==
Carolyn Kaelin decided to specialize in breast surgery because it allowed her to know her patients well and provide long-term care unlike other surgical specialties. At the age of 34, Kaelin was appointed as a founding director of the Comprehensive Breast Health Center at Brigham and Women’s Hospital, a major Harvard teaching hospital. In 2001, she was selected as one of Newsweek's 15 Women of the New Century. Kaelin was diagnosed with breast cancer in July 2003. She underwent multiple operations, one of which caused her to lose sensation in her fingers, leading to the end of her surgical career.

== Personal life ==
Carolyn Kaelin met her husband, William Kaelin Jr., while studying at the Johns Hopkins School of Medicine. They were married in 1988. Kaelin had two children, Kathryn and William (Tripp). Both are graduates of Yale University. Carolyn Kaelin was diagnosed with glioblastoma multiforme in 2010 and died of the tumor at her home in Charlestown, Massachusetts, on July 28, 2015, aged 54.

== Bibliography ==
- Living Through Breast Cancer (2005)
- The Breast Cancer Survivor's Fitness Plan (2007)
