= Kathryn Moore =

Canadian microbiologist

Kathryn J. Moore
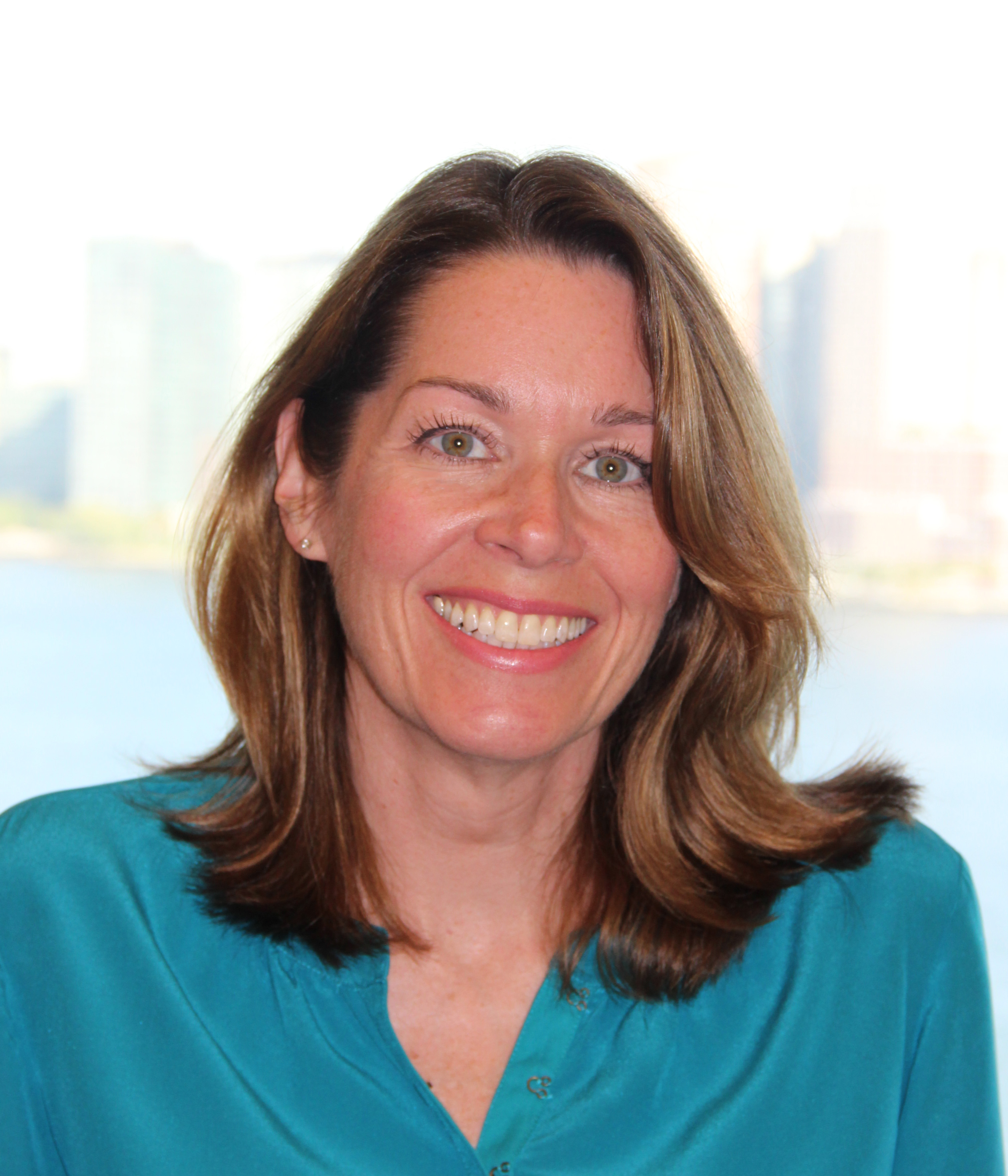
- Education: McGill University
- Known for: Atherosclerosis
- Awards: National Institutes of Health R35 Outstanding Investigator Award Fellow of the National Academy of Sciences American Heart Association Distinguished Scientist Award
- Scientific career
- Fields: Atherosclerosis and Inflammation
- Workplaces: Harvard Medical School; New York University Langone Medical Center
- Thesis: Regulation of macrophage function during intracellular infection with Leishmania donovani. (1994)
- Doctoral advisor: Greg Matlashewski
- Website: https://kathrynmoorelab.com/

Kathryn J. Moore is a Canadian-born American biomedical scientist and cell biologist. She is the Jean and David Blechman Professor of Cardiology and the founding director of the Cardiovascular Research Center at the New York University Grossman School of Medicine. Moore's research considers the pathogenesis of atherosclerosis, with a focus on the identification of novel therapeutic targets. She was elected Fellow of the National Academy of Sciences in 2021.

== Early life and education ==
Kathryn Moore was born in Montreal, Quebec, Canada, where she attended McGill University. Moore studied microbiology, receiving her BSc (Distinction) from McGill University in 1989. She remained there for graduate studies, studying mechanisms by which the intracellular pathogen Leishmania donovani subverts macrophage microbicidal functions, under the Canadian immunologist Greg Matlashewski. Moore was awarded her PhD in parasitology in 1994.

== Research and career ==
Moore joined the Harvard Medical School faculty as an Instructor in Medicine in 1999 and was promoted to Assistant Professor in 2002. Her early research focused on innate immune mechanisms of chronic inflammation in age-related diseases such as atherosclerosis and Alzheimer’s Disease.

In 2009, Moore was recruited to the New York University Langone Medical Center, where she continued to focus on origins of cardiovascular and metabolic diseases, in particular the roles that chronic inflammation and lipid dysregulation play in these processes. She contributed to seminal studies showing that cholesterol crystals in atherosclerotic plaques cause lysosomal damage that activates the NLRP3 inflammasome to promote the maturation and release of interleukin-1b.

== Awards and honors ==
- 2003 Ellison Medical Foundation New Scholar in Aging Award
- 2006 Claflin Distinguished Scholar Award
- 2009 American Heart Association Special Recognition Award in Vascular Biology
- 2012 Jeffrey M. Hoeg Award for Basic Science and Clinical Research
- 2018 ATVB Mentor of Women Award
- 2019 Web of Science List of Most Highly Cited Researchers
- 2020 Web of Science List of Most Highly Cited Researchers
- 2020 ATVB George Lyman Duff Memorial Lecture Award
- 2021 Web of Science List of Most Highly Cited Researchers
- 2021 ATVB Distinguished Scientist Award
- 2021 Elected Fellow of the National Academy of Sciences
- 2022 Gill Heart and Vascular Institute Award for Outstanding Contributions to Cardiovascular Research
- 2024 Grand Prix scientifique de la Fondation Lefoulon-Delalande
