= Attilio Maseri =

Italian cardiologist (1935–2021)

- Born: 12 November 1935; Udine, Italy
- Died: 3 September 2021 (aged 85); Tolmezzo, Italy
- Education: University of Padua, Italy; University of Pisa, Italy
- Known for: coronary artery disease
- Awards: King Faisal International Prize (1992); Lefoulon-Delalande Prize (2004)
- Scientific career
- Fields: Cardiology
- Workplaces: University of Pisa, Italy; Hammersmith Hospital, London, England; Università Cattolica del Sacro Cuore, Rome, Italy

Attilio Maseri OMRI KSG (12 November 1935 – 3 September 2021) was an Italian academic and physician specialized in cardiology, considered a leading researcher in the field of ischemic heart disease. His patients included Queen Elizabeth II and Pope John Paul II.

== Early life and education ==
Maseri was born on 12 November 1935. Maseri, a native of Italy, graduated in 1960 with a doctorate in medicine from the University of Padua, followed by further qualifications in cardiology (1963) and nuclear medicine (1968) from the University of Pisa. During this time he worked as a research fellow at Columbia University (1965) and Johns Hopkins University (1966). He married countess Francesca Florio, member of a local historical family.

== Career ==
In 1967, he became assistant professor in the department of medicine and head of the coronary artery disease research group at the University of Pisa. In 1979 he was appointed professor of cardiovascular medicine at the Royal Postgraduate Medical School of the University of London and director of cardiology at Hammersmith Hospital. In 1991 he returned to Italy, where he became professor of cardiology at the Università Cattolica del Sacro Cuore in Rome and director of cardiology at the Agostino Gemelli University Polyclinic. From 2002 to 2008, he was a professor of cardiology at the Vita-Salute San Raffaele University and director of the cardio-thoracic and vascular department at the San Raffaele Hospital, both in Milan.

Since 2008 he was president of the Fondazione per il Tuo Cuore (Heart Care Foundation), a division of ANMCO (the Italian Cardiological Association), which he co-founded in 1998.

He served on the editorial board of the New England Journal of Medicine.

=== Scientific achievements ===
As a young scientist, one of Maseri's main goals was the measurement of coronary flow. During his time in Pisa he pioneered the use of radioactive tracers, and later developed methods using positron emission tomography to study both blood flow and energy use in the heart.

In Pisa he made the first clinical observations of angina as a primary complaint, not caused by excessive myocardial oxygen demand. He also demonstrated the role of coronary artery spasm in variant angina. His proof, using double crossover studies, that nitrates prevent coronary artery spasm provided the first convincing evidence for the now-widespread clinical use of coronary vasodilators as anti-ischemic drugs. He further elucidated the mechanisms by which coronary artery spasm occurs in variant angina after moving to London.

While at the Hammersmith Hospital, he also showed that there were differences among patients with chronic stable angina in the degree of exertion at which chest pains occurred. Moreover, that variability was caused by narrowing of the arteries in combination with vasomotor tone, but the two factors interacted in a different way than was observed in variant angina. In other studies, he demonstrated that vasoconstriction and thrombosis are jointly responsible for ischemic attacks in patients with acute myocardial infarction or unstable angina. He also identified adenosine as a major chemical mediator of ischemic cardiac pain.

With his group in Rome, he developed a hypothesis of dispersed coronary microvascular dysfunction in angina patients with normal coronary angiograms, investigated the mechanisms of angina in patients with microvascular angina, and made fundamental contributions towards identifying the processes by which inflammation causes heart attacks in unstable angina. After moving to Milan, he continued his clinical research using newer techniques such as nuclear magnetic resonance and computer tomography to explore cardiac and coronary function.

Maseri described his primary research interest as discovering what makes one patient different from another. In the final stage of his research career, he used the database of patients at the Fondazione per il Tuo Cuore to conduct research into individual paths to pathology.

== Honours and awards ==
Maseri is one of few physicians to be made a lifetime member of the Johns Hopkins Society of Scholars (1988). In 1992 he was awarded the King Faisal International Prize in Medicine for contributions to the understanding of coronary artery disease. In 1997 the American College of Cardiology presented him with its Distinguished Scientist Award. In 2002 he received the Gold Medal of the European Society of Cardiology. In 2004 he accepted the Grand Prix scientifique de la Fondation Lefoulon-Delalande for clinical investigations of vasomotor function in angina pectoris. He was appointed Commander of the Order of Merit of the Italian Republic in 1989, and promoted to Knight Grand Cross of the same Order in 2005. John Paul II appointed him Knight Commander of the Order of St. Gregory the Great.

== Death ==
Maseri died on 3 September 2021, at the age of 85.

== Bibliography ==
- Maseri, Attilio (1995). Ischemic heart disease : a rational basis for clinical practice and clinical research. New York: Churchill Livingstone. ISBN 978-0-443-07910-8. OCLC 32397557.
- Bibliography of works by Attilio Maseri at WorldCat
