= Gregg L. Semenza =

American physician (born 1956)

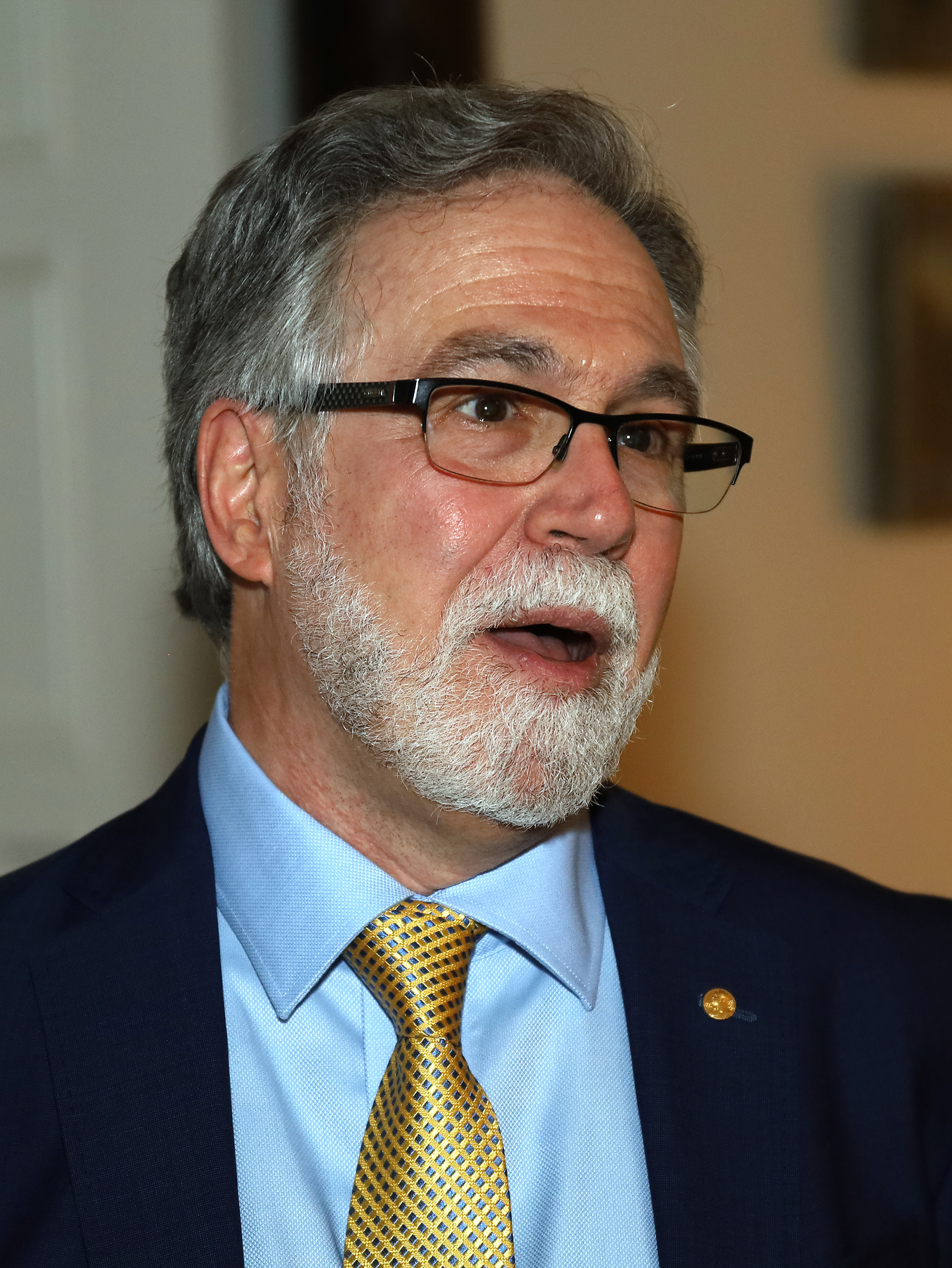
- Semenza in Stockholm, December, 2019
- Born: Gregg Leonard Semenza; July 12, 1956 (age 70); New York City, U.S.
- Education: Harvard University (AB); University of Pennsylvania (MD, PhD)
- Known for: Hypoxia-inducible factors
- Spouse: Laura Kasch-Semenza
- Awards: Albert Lasker Award for Basic Medical Research (2016); Nobel Prize in Physiology or Medicine (2019)
- Scientific career
- Workplaces: Johns Hopkins School of Medicine
- Thesis: Molecular genetic analysis of the silent carrier of beta thalassemia (haplotype) (1984)
- Doctoral advisors: Elias Schwartz; Saul Surrey

Gregg Leonard Semenza (born July 12, 1956) is an American pediatrician and Professor of Genetic Medicine at the Johns Hopkins School of Medicine. He serves as the director of the vascular program at the Institute for Cell Engineering. He is a 2016 recipient of the Albert Lasker Award for Basic Medical Research. He is known for his discovery of HIF-1, which allows cancer cells to adapt to oxygen-poor environments. He shared the 2019 Nobel Prize in Physiology or Medicine for "discoveries of how cells sense and adapt to oxygen availability" with William Kaelin Jr. and Peter J. Ratcliffe. Semenza has had thirteen research papers retracted due to issues such as duplicated images and potential data manipulation.

== Early life ==
Semenza was born on July 12, 1956, in Flushing, New York City; he and his four siblings grew up in Westchester County, New York. His father's family was of Italian descent whereas his mother's family was of German-English-Irish descent.

== Education and career ==
Semenza grew up in Westchester County, New York and attended Washington Irving Intermediate School in Tarrytown, New York. He then attended Sleepy Hollow High School where he was a mid-fielder on the soccer team and graduated in 1974. As an undergraduate at Harvard University, he studied medical genetics and mapped genes on chromosome 21. For his MD-PhD at the University of Pennsylvania, he sequenced genes linked to the recessive genetic disorder, beta-thalassemia. Semenza subsequently completed his Pediatrics residency at Duke University before completing a postdoctoral fellowship at Johns Hopkins University. Semenza became the founding director of the Vascular Program at the Johns Hopkins Institute for Cell Engineering following his post-doctorate.

== Research ==
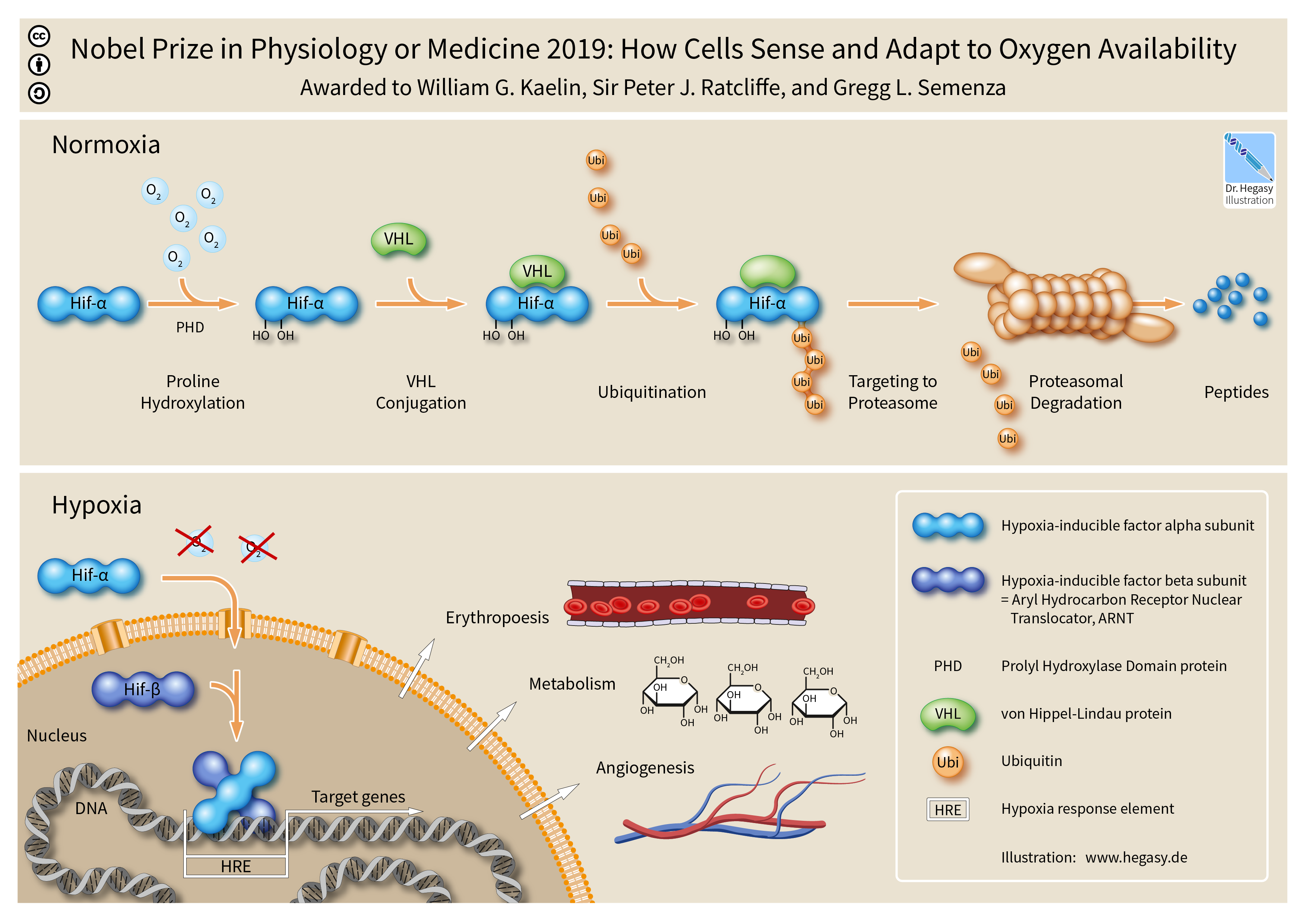
Illustration of how cells sense and adapt to oxygen availability

While a post-doctorate researcher at Johns Hopkins, Semenza evaluated gene expression in transgenic animals to determine how this affected the production of erythropoietin (EPO), known to be part of the means for the body to react to hypoxia, or low oxygen levels in the blood. Semenza identified the gene sequences that expressed hypoxia-inducible factors (HIF) proteins. Semenza's work showed that the HIF proteins consisted of two parts; HIF-1β, a stable base to most conditions, and HIF-1α that deteriorated when nominal oxygen levels were present. HIF-1α was further found essential to the EPO production process, as test subjects modified to be deficient in HIF-1α were found to have malformed blood vessels and decreased EPO levels. These HIF proteins were found across multiple test animals. Semenza further found that HIF-1α overproduction could lead to cancer in other subjects.

Semenza's research overlapped with that of William Kaelin and Peter J. Ratcliffe on determining the mechanism of oxygen detection in cells, and how EPO production is regulated by HIF and other factors. This has led to the development of drugs that help regulate these processes for patients with anaemia and kidney failure.

== Retractions ==
In 2011, Semenza retracted a Biochemical Journal paper that he had coauthored with Naoki Mori and others. In 2022, he retracted four papers from PNAS, according to Retraction Watch. As of 2022, concerns about the integrity of images in 52 articles coauthored by Semenza have been raised on PubPeer. This has led to investigations by the journals where these articles appeared, resulting in many corrections, retractions and expressions of concern.

In 2023, additional papers in PNAS and Oncogene were retracted.

As of 2024, Semenza has had 13 of his research papers retracted due to issues such as potential improper manipulation and/or duplication of images.

== Personal life ==
Semenza is married to Laura Kasch-Semenza, whom he had met while at Johns Hopkins, and who currently operates one of the university's genotyping facilities.

== Awards ==
- 1989: Lucille P. Markey Scholar Award in Biomedical Science, Markey Trust
- 1995: Elected Member of the American Society for Clinical Investigation
- 2000: E. Mead Johnson Award for Research in Pediatrics, Society for Pediatric Research
- 2008: Elected Member of the National Academy of Sciences
- 2008: Elected Member of the Association of American Physicians
- 2010: Gairdner Foundation International Award
- 2012: Elected to the Institute of Medicine
- 2012: The Scientific Grand Prize of the Lefoulon-Delalande Foundation
- 2012: Stanley J. Korsmeyer Award, American Society for Clinical Investigation
- 2014: Wiley Prize
- 2016: Albert Lasker Award for Basic Medical Research (with William Kaelin and Peter J. Ratcliffe)
- 2019: Nobel Prize in Physiology or Medicine (with William Kaelin and Peter J. Ratcliffe), awarded by the Nobel Prize committee "for their discoveries of how cells sense and adapt to oxygen availability."
