= Elisabetta Dejana =

Italian biologist, hematologist and cancer researcher

- Born: 21 November 1951; Bologna, Italy
- Occupation: Biologist,
- Known for: Research into Angiogenesis
- Awards: Feltrinelli Prize; Grand Prix scientifique de la Fondation Lefoulon-Delalande

Elisabetta Dejana (born November 21, 1951) is an Italian cell biologist and an expert on regulation of vascular system development. She has published widely and is frequently cited for her work. She has received several important awards. Dejana is a full professor at the University of Milan and has also been appointed full professor at the Department of Immunology, Genetics and Pathology at Uppsala University in Sweden.

== Training ==
Elisabetta Dejana was born on 21 November 1951 in Bologna, Italy. She obtained a doctorate (summa cum laude) from the University of Bologna in biological sciences.

== Career ==
Between 1977 and 1979, Dejana was a postdoctoral fellow at the Dept. of Pathology, McMaster University, in Hamilton, Ontario, Canada. From 1979 to 1983 she was a researcher at the cardiovascular pharmacology laboratory of the Mario Negri Institute for Pharmacological Research in Milan. In 1983 she became chief of the vascular physiopathology unit of the same institute, leaving in 1988 to be a visiting scientist at the Department of Pathology of Harvard Medical School in Boston, USA. In 1989, she was a visiting scientist, at the Hadassah Medical School in Jerusalem. Returning to Milan, she set up the vascular biology laboratory, which she headed until 1993.

While continuing to study vascular cell biology, Dejana also began to investigate angiogenesis, the process by which new blood vessels form in an embryo as well as during the growth of a tumour. Blocking blood vessel formation in a cancer may provide a means to stop the cancer's growth. The idea is that, if starved, the tumour will shrink and become more susceptible to treatment. She researched this topic from 1993 to 1996 as director of the hematology laboratory of the Centre d'Études Nucléaires in Grenoble, France, while also teaching in Paris. Returning to Italy, she participated in a project of the Italian Foundation for Cancer Research (FIRC) to create a new institute dedicated to cancer research and, when the Molecular Oncology Institute (IFOM) was established in Milan, she was among the first scientists to set up her laboratory there. She directed the establishment of an IFOM research programme to study angiogenesis and develop therapeutic strategies to inhibit tumour growth and has been the chief of that programme since 2000.

As regards teaching, Dejana has given courses in vascular biology at several European Universities. In 1998, she became Associate Professor of General Pathology at the University of Insubria in Varese, Italy. Since 2002, she has held the position of full professor at the University of Milan. She has also been appointed full professor at the Department of Immunology, Genetics and Pathology at Uppsala University, Sweden.

== Awards and honours ==
Dejana has many the recipient of several distinguished awards:

- 1996. Prize of the International Society on Thrombosis and Haemostasis Paris, France
- 1997. Wenner-Gren Foundation Award, Stockholm, Sweden
- 1999. Johns Hopkins Award in Lung Vascular Biology
- 2007. William Harvey Outstanding Contribution to Science Award
- 2010. Honorary degree in medicine from the University of Helsinki, Finland
- 2013. Award from the International Union of Physiological Sciences, Birmingham, UK
- 2014. Premio Ippocrate per la Divulgazione della Scienza, Italy
- 2014. Feltrinelli Prize for Excellence in Science, Accademia dei Lincei, Rome
- 2014. Honorary degree in medicine from the University of Frankfurt, Germany
- 2016. North American Vascular Biology Organization - Earl P. Benditt Award, Boston, USA
- 2016. Grand Prix scientifique de la Fondation Lefoulon-Delalande, Paris (shared with Elisabeth Tournier-Lasserve).
- 2018. Prix International de l’INSERM, Paris, France
- 2019. European Vascular Biology Organisation (EVBO) Medal Award Winner, Maastricht

In addition, Dejana has been invited to serve on many scientific advisory boards.

== Publications ==
Elisabetta Dejana has authored over 400 scientific articles published in peer-reviewed international journals. Her report of the discovery of VE-cadherin as a key protein component of cell-to-cell adherence junctions has led to the appearance of more than 2100 publications related to VE-cadherin in peer-reviewed journals. Journal articles where she has been the sole author or a leading author include:

- 1991. MG Lampugnani, M Resnati, E Dejana, PC Marchisio. The role of integrins in the maintenance of endothelial monolayer integrity. The Journal of cell biology 112 (3), 479-490 (323 citations)
- 1995. E Dejana, M Corada, MG Lampugnani. Endothelial cell‐to‐cell junctions. The FASEB Journal 9 (10), 910-918 (609 citations)
- C Garlanda, E Dejana 1997. Heterogeneity of endothelial cells: specific markers. Arteriosclerosis, thrombosis, and vascular biology 17 (7), 1193-1202 (599 citations)
- 1996. E Dejana. Endothelial adherens junctions: implications in the control of vascular permeability and angiogenesis. The Journal of clinical investigation 98 (9), 1949-1953 (374 citations)
- 1999. E Dejana, G Bazzoni, MG Lampugnani. Vascular endothelial (VE)-cadherin: only an intercellular glue? Experimental cell research 252 (1), 13-19 (320 citations)
- 2004. E Dejana. Endothelial cell–cell junctions: happy together. Nature reviews Molecular cell biology 5 (4), 261-270 (1284 citations)
- 2008. E Dejana, F Orsenigo, MG Lampugnani. The role of adherens junctions and VE-cadherin in the control of vascular permeability. Journal of cell science 121 (13), 2115-2122 (976 citations)
- 2009. E Dejana, E Tournier-Lasserve, BM Weinstein. The control of vascular integrity by endothelial cell junctions: molecular basis and pathological implications. Developmental cell 16 (2), 209-221 (758 citations)
