= Hugh Grosvenor Calkins =

American cardiologist

Hugh Calkins
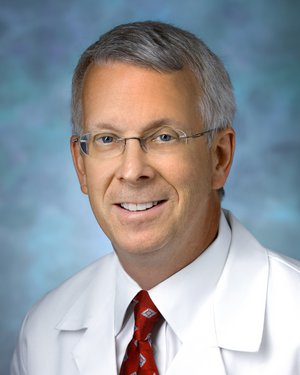
- Born: Hugh Grosvenor Calkins
- Education: Williams College (BA); Harvard Medical School (MD)
- Known for: Research on catheter ablation, atrial fibrillation, cardiac arrhythmias, and arrhythmogenic right ventricular cardiomyopathy (ARVC)
- Awards: Eric N. Prystowsky Lectureship Award (2023)
- Scientific career
- Fields: Cardiology, Cardiac electrophysiology
- Workplaces: Johns Hopkins University School of Medicine

Hugh Calkins is an American cardiologist and cardiac electrophysiologist. He is the Catherine Ellen Poindexter Professor of Cardiology and Professor of Medicine at the Johns Hopkins University School of Medicine, where he directs the Arrhythmia Service and the Clinical Electrophysiology Laboratory at the Johns Hopkins Hospital, as well as the Johns Hopkins program for arrhythmogenic right ventricular cardiomyopathy (ARVC), which he founded in 1999. His clinical and research work has focused on catheter ablation of cardiac arrhythmias, atrial fibrillation, syncope and ARVC.

Calkins was the first author of the 2007 international expert consensus statement on catheter and surgical ablation of atrial fibrillation and chaired the task forces that produced the subsequent 2012 and 2017 statements. He was also a co-author of the revised diagnostic criteria for ARVC published in 2010. He served as president of the Heart Rhythm Society from 2013 to 2014 and received the society's Distinguished Service Award in 2024.

== Early life and education ==
Both of Calkins's parents were physicians. He graduated magna cum laude with highest honors in chemistry from Williams College, where he was elected to Phi Beta Kappa. He received his Doctor of Medicine from Harvard Medical School, after which he completed residency training in medicine at Massachusetts General Hospital. He began a cardiology fellowship at Johns Hopkins in 1986 and completed it in 1989. He trained in cardiac electrophysiology at Johns Hopkins and at the University of Michigan.

== Career ==
Calkins held his first faculty appointment at the University of Michigan, where he directed the Pacemaker Service. In 1992 he returned to Johns Hopkins as director of the Arrhythmia Service and the Clinical Electrophysiology Laboratory, and in 1995 he also became director of the hospital's Tilt Diagnostic Laboratory. He has also directed the Johns Hopkins Atrial Fibrillation Center.

In 2008 he was named the inaugural Nicholas J. Fortuin Professor of Cardiology, a professorship established that year by some 300 patients, colleagues and organizations in honor of the Johns Hopkins cardiologist Nicholas J. Fortuin. In 2019 he became the first holder of the Catherine Ellen Poindexter Professorship in Cardiology, a chair endowed by Marilyn and Christian Poindexter in memory of their granddaughter. Calkins had first treated Christian Poindexter in 1993, and the Poindexters chose him as the professorship's first holder.

In 2022, Marvin H. Weiner, a patient of Calkins since 1996, made a $7.5 million commitment to establish the Hugh Calkins, Marvin H. Weiner and Jaqueline J. Bernstein Cardiac Arrhythmia Center at Johns Hopkins, the first named center in the Division of Cardiology to be fully endowed through philanthropy. The gift supports research into cardiac arrhythmias and the training of cardiac electrophysiology specialists.

== Research ==
Early in his career, Calkins and colleagues, including Fred Morady, published clinical studies of radiofrequency catheter ablation for supraventricular tachycardias. A 1991 study in the New England Journal of Medicine, of which he was first author, reported that in 106 consecutive patients with paroxysmal supraventricular tachycardia or Wolff–Parkinson–White syndrome, diagnosis and curative ablation could be performed during a single electrophysiologic procedure. A 1992 report in Circulation described radiofrequency ablation of accessory atrioventricular connections in 250 patients, in which 94 percent of patients had all accessory connections successfully ablated and remained free of symptomatic tachycardia over a mean follow-up of about ten months.

Calkins began studying arrhythmogenic right ventricular dysplasia/cardiomyopathy in the late 1990s and has described his publications on the disease as a body of research he is particularly proud of. The Johns Hopkins ARVD/C program was established in 1999 through the combined efforts of affected families and a team of Hopkins cardiologists, together with a patient registry that forms the basis of most of its research. Calkins is principal investigator of the registry, which follows patients and family members to study the cause, course and genetics of the condition. He was among the international experts who revised the Task Force criteria for the clinical diagnosis of ARVC, published in 2010. The program was later designated a Johns Hopkins inHealth Precision Medicine Center of Excellence.

In the field of atrial fibrillation, Calkins was the first author of the 2007 HRS/EHRA/ECAS expert consensus statement on catheter and surgical ablation, which was developed by a Heart Rhythm Society task force in partnership with the European Heart Rhythm Association and the European Cardiac Arrhythmia Society. He then chaired the Heart Rhythm Society task force that produced the 2012 HRS/EHRA/ECAS expert consensus statement on the same subject. He again chaired the writing group for the 2017 statement, which was developed jointly with the European, Asia-Pacific and Latin American heart rhythm societies.

== Professional service ==
Calkins chaired the program committee for the Heart Rhythm 2012 Scientific Sessions. In May 2013 he was named the 35th president of the Heart Rhythm Society at its annual scientific sessions in Denver, succeeding Anne M. Gillis. The society's online Learning Center, conceived in 2014, was inspired by Calkins.

He has served on the editorial boards of the Journal of the American College of Cardiology, Heart Rhythm, Circulation: Arrhythmia and Electrophysiology, the Journal of Interventional Cardiac Electrophysiology and the Journal of Cardiovascular Electrophysiology, of which he has been an associate editor. He is a fellow of the American College of Cardiology, the American Heart Association and the Heart Rhythm Society.

== Honors and awards ==
- First prize, North American Society of Pacing and Electrophysiology (NASPE) Young Investigator Competition (1988)
- Helen B. Taussig Award, Maryland Affiliate of the American Heart Association (1999)
- Elected member, American Clinical and Climatological Association (2006)
- Van Ruyven Medal, Heart Lung Foundation Utrecht (2012)
- Highly Cited Researcher in clinical medicine, Thomson Reuters/Clarivate (2015, 2016 and 2017)
- Founders Lectureship Award, Heart Rhythm Society (2019)
- Elected member, Association of American Physicians (2020)
- Eric N. Prystowsky Lectureship Award, Heart Rhythm Society (2023)
- Distinguished Service Award, Heart Rhythm Society (2024)

== Selected publications ==
- Calkins H, Sousa J, el-Atassi R, et al. "Diagnosis and cure of the Wolff–Parkinson–White syndrome or paroxysmal supraventricular tachycardias during a single electrophysiologic test." New England Journal of Medicine. 1991;324(23):1612–1618. doi:10.1056/NEJM199106063242302
- Calkins H, Langberg J, Sousa J, et al. "Radiofrequency catheter ablation of accessory atrioventricular connections in 250 patients. Abbreviated therapeutic approach to Wolff–Parkinson–White syndrome." Circulation. 1992;85(4):1337–1346. doi:10.1161/01.cir.85.4.1337
- Calkins H, Brugada J, Packer DL, et al. "HRS/EHRA/ECAS expert consensus statement on catheter and surgical ablation of atrial fibrillation: recommendations for personnel, policy, procedures and follow-up." Heart Rhythm. 2007;4(6):816–861. doi:10.1016/j.hrthm.2007.04.005
- Marcus FI, McKenna WJ, Sherrill D, Basso C, Bauce B, Bluemke DA, Calkins H, et al. "Diagnosis of arrhythmogenic right ventricular cardiomyopathy/dysplasia: proposed modification of the Task Force Criteria." Circulation. 2010;121(13):1533–1541. doi:10.1161/CIRCULATIONAHA.108.840827
- Calkins H, Kuck KH, Cappato R, et al. "2012 HRS/EHRA/ECAS expert consensus statement on catheter and surgical ablation of atrial fibrillation." Heart Rhythm. 2012;9(4):632–696.e21. doi:10.1016/j.hrthm.2011.12.016
- Calkins H, Hindricks G, Cappato R, et al. "2017 HRS/EHRA/ECAS/APHRS/SOLAECE expert consensus statement on catheter and surgical ablation of atrial fibrillation." Heart Rhythm. 2017;14(10):e275–e444. doi:10.1016/j.hrthm.2017.05.012
