= Harold F. Dvorak =

American pathologist and vascular researcher

Harold Fisher Dvorak is an American pathologist and vascular researcher. He is the founding Director of the Center for Vascular Biology Research at the Beth Israel Deaconess Medical Center and the Mallinckrodt Distinguished Professor of Pathology at Harvard Medical School. Dvorak is best known for his discovery of vascular endothelial growth factor (VEGF), for which he received the Canada Gairdner International Award of 2014.

He graduated from Princeton University and Harvard Medical School.

== Awards ==
Year	Award
2005	Grand Prix scientifique de la Fondation Lefoulon-Delalande (shared with Napoleone Ferrara and Moses Judah Folkman)
2014	Canada Gairdner International Award
