= HIF hydroxylase =

HIF hydroxylase may refer to the following enzymes:

- Hypoxia-inducible factor-proline dioxygenase
- Hypoxia-inducible factor-asparagine dioxygenase
