= Theodore DeWeese =

American radiation oncologist and academic administrator

Theodore L. DeWeese is the Francis Watt Baker, M.D. and Lennox D. Baker, M.D. dean of the medical faculty at Johns Hopkins University School of Medicine and the chief executive officer of Johns Hopkins Medicine. He was appointed in December 2023 after serving in an interim capacity for 18 months.

DeWeese is a professor of oncology and urology at the Johns Hopkins University School of Medicine. His areas of medical expertise include prostate cancer, radiation oncology, urological oncology and DNA damage and repair.

== Education and career ==
DeWeese, who grew up in Denver, Colorado, received his medical degree from the University of Colorado Health Sciences Center in 1990. He joined The Johns Hopkins Hospital as a radiation oncology resident in 1991 and served as chief resident. In 1994, he completed his residency in radiation oncology, and then undertook a laboratory research fellowship at the Johns Hopkins Oncology Center and the James Buchanan Brady Urological Institute. In 1995, DeWeese received his board certification in radiation oncology.

DeWeese went on to become the founding director of Johns Hopkins University School of Medicine’s Department of Radiation Oncology and Molecular Radiation Sciences, a role he held for more than 15 years. In 2018, DeWeese became vice dean of clinical affairs and President of the Clinical Practice Association for Johns Hopkins.

DeWeese is a past president of the American Society for Radiation Oncology. In July 2022, following Paul B. Rothman's retirement, DeWeese was appointed interim dean of the Johns Hopkins University School of Medicine and CEO of Johns Hopkins Medicine. In December 2023, he became the 15th dean of the medical faculty and the third CEO of Johns Hopkins Medicine.

== Research and publications ==
DeWeese has contributed to more than 220 research papers.

== Honors and appointments ==
DeWeese has served on numerous committees and boards, including as president and chair of the board for the American Society for Radiation Oncology. He has also served on committees for the American Association for Cancer Research and the American Society of Clinical Oncology. DeWeese was also appointed by the National Academy of Sciences as a scientific counselor for the Radiation Effects Research Foundation in Hiroshima, Japan.

DeWeese has received numerous awards and honors, including a Doris Duke Clinical Scientist Award in 1999 for cancer research and two teaching awards from Johns Hopkins, one for teaching clinical science and one for teaching basic science.
