= Naoki Mori (virologist) =

Japanese virologist

Naoki Mori (森 直樹, Mori Naoki) is a Japanese virologist who is a professor at the University of the Ryukyus in Okinawa Prefecture, Japan. He has received numerous awards for his research on human T-cell leukemia virus type 1 (HTLV-1), a retrovirus which causes adult T-cell leukemia.

== Research fraud ==
In 2010, Retraction Watch reported that five of Mori's papers had been retracted by the journal Infection and Immunity. (The New York Times later put that figure at six.) The papers, which were published between 2000 and 2009, described studies on H. pylori. Mori was banned for ten years from publishing articles in journals operated by the American Society for Microbiology after it was determined that he had manipulated data and images in a number of articles. By October 2011, 30 papers coauthored by Mori had been retracted, including five from Infection and Immunity, seven from the International Journal of Cancer, two from Blood, and one from Biochemical and Biophysical Research Communications titled "Downregulation of citrin, a mitochondrial AGC, is associated with apoptosis of hepatocytes". Mori took "full responsibility" for "multiple inaccurate and inappropriately duplicated" images, and was dismissed from his university post in August 2010.

Mori contested his dismissal in court, and the University of the Ryukyus instead imposed a 10-month suspension. Mori was rehired in March 2011 and had resumed publishing by April 2012 with a research paper titled "Honokiol induces cell cycle arrest and apoptosis via inhibition of survival signals in adult T-cell leukemia".
