= Johns Hopkins School of Medicine =

Medical school of Johns Hopkins University

Coordinates: 39°17′56″N 76°35′39″W

Johns Hopkins University School of Medicine
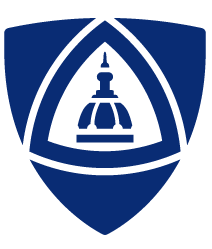
- Type: Private medical school
- Established: 1893
- Parent institution: Johns Hopkins University
- President: Ronald J. Daniels
- Dean: Theodore DeWeese
- Faculty: 2,980+ full-time 1,270+ part-time
- Students: 480 (M.D. and M.D.-Ph.D); 1,400 total
- Location: Baltimore, Maryland, U.S.
- Campus: Urban
- Website: hopkinsmedicine.org

The Johns Hopkins University School of Medicine (JHUSOM) is the medical school of Johns Hopkins University, a private research university in Baltimore, Maryland. Established in 1893 following the construction of the Johns Hopkins Hospital, Hopkins became a model for modern medical education.

The School of Medicine is located in Baltimore, where it shares a campus in East Baltimore with the School of Nursing, Bloomberg School of Public Health, and Johns Hopkins Hospital, the school's primary teaching hospital. As part of the larger Johns Hopkins Medicine health system, the school is also affiliated with numerous regional hospitals and medical centers including the Johns Hopkins Bayview Medical Center, Johns Hopkins Howard County Medical Center, Suburban Hospital in Montgomery County, Sibley Memorial Hospital in Washington, D.C.

== History ==
Before his death in 1873, Baltimore financier and philanthropist Johns Hopkins appointed a 12-member board of trustees to carry out his vision for a university and hospital that would be linked to each other by a medical school, which was at the time a radical idea.

Construction of the Johns Hopkins Hospital began in 1877 with the razing of the site formerly occupied by the city's mental asylum, and took twelve years to complete. By the time the hospital opened in 1889, only six of the original twelve trustees appointed by Hopkins were still alive. Despite having already recruited the necessary faculty, the board no longer had enough funds to establish the medical school.

Four of the original trustee's daughters, led by Mary Elizabeth Garrett, started a nationwide fundraising campaign to secure funding for the medical school. The campaign was stipulated on the condition that the remaining trustees agree to open the medical school to both men and women, as women were generally excluded from medical education in the 1890s. When the Johns Hopkins University School of Medicine officially opened its doors in 1893, there were three women in its first class.

The founding physicians of the JHUSOM were pathologist William Henry Welch (1850–1934), the first dean of the school, Canadian internist William Osler (1849–1919), author of The Principles and Practice of Medicine (1892), surgeon William Stewart Halsted (1852–1922), who revolutionized surgery by insisting on subtle skill and technique and strict adherence to aseptic technique, and gynecological surgeon Howard Atwood Kelly (1858–1943), credited with establishing gynecology as a specialty and among the first to use radium in the treatment of cancer.

=== Research and innovation ===
The Johns Hopkins School of Medicine has a long history of groundbreaking medical research and breakthroughs.

Many aspects of modern medical education in the United States were introduced by Johns Hopkins. The first formal medical residency programs were created by founding faculty William Osler and William Stewart Halsted at Johns Hopkins Hospital.

A Johns Hopkins surgical team including Alfred Blalock, Helen Taussig, and Vivien Thomas pioneered a surgical procedure used to correct common congenital heart defects such as Tetralogy of Fallot that cause blue baby syndrome.

After a series of case studies at the Harriet Lane Home (now Johns Hopkins Children's Center), the first of whom was Donald Triplett, Hopkins psychiatrist Leo Kanner published the first clinical description of autism in 1943.

Hopkins researchers made critical contributions to the development of cardiopulmonary resuscitation (CPR). Surgeon James Jude along with engineers William Kouwenhoeven and Guy Knickerbocker discovered the effectiveness of external chest compressions following cardiac arrest, which were combined with mouth-to-mouth resuscitation to create the modern technique. Kouwenhoeven was also part of a Hopkins team that conducted the earliest research on electric cardiac defibrillation and later successfully developed a closed-chest defibrillation device.

The oldest cultured human cell line, known as HeLa, was first isolated from the cervical cancer cells of Johns Hopkins patient Henrietta Lacks in 1951. The cell line has immortalized and is still widely used in medical research.

Johns Hopkins neuroscientist Sol Snyder led a team that discovered opioid receptors, leading into further research uncovering the role of neurotransmitters in the brain as well as drug development for disorders such as schizophrenia.

The implantable cardioverter-defibrillator (ICD) was invented by a team of Hopkins researchers at Sinai Hospital in Baltimore.

Department of Microbiology faculty Hamilton O. Smith discovered HindII, the first site-specific restriction enzyme, which was used by his colleague Daniel Nathans to successful cleave the DNA of a tumor virus. Smith and Nathans were jointly awarded the 1978 Nobel Prize in Medicine along with Werner Arber for their work, which established the foundation for modern-day genetic engineering.

In 1995, Nobel laureate and longtime Hopkins faculty Gregg L. Semenza identified gene sequences responsible for the expression of hypoxia-inducible factors (HIFs), which help the body react to low oxygen levels in the blood.

Hopkins and NHLBI researchers led by Samuel Charache published a landmark study in 1995 reporting the effectiveness of hydroxyurea in reducing painful complications of sick cell disease, leading to the drug being approved by the Food and Drug Administration three years later as a treatment.

While researching red blood cell membrane proteins, Peter Agre's laboratory discovered aquaporins, protein channels that enable the flow of water into and out of cells. Agre was awarded the 2003 Nobel Prize in Medicine.

== Facilities ==
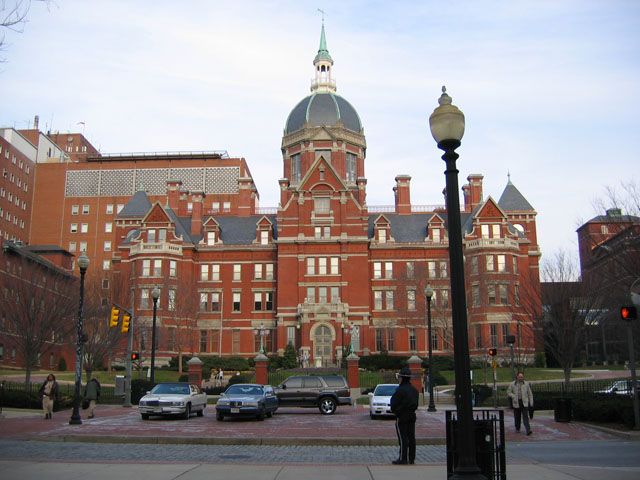
Original Johns Hopkins Hospital building, designed by John Shaw Billings and located on the Medical Campus.

The School of Medicine, along with the Johns Hopkins Hospital (the School of Medicine's primary teaching hospital), Johns Hopkins Children's Center, Bloomberg School of Public Health, and School of Nursing, are located on the Johns Hopkins Medical Campus in East Baltimore.

The wider Johns Hopkins Medicine system includes several other regional medical centers, including Johns Hopkins Bayview Medical Center on Eastern Avenue in East Baltimore, Howard County General Hospital in Columbia, Suburban Hospital in Bethesda, Sibley Memorial Hospital in Washington, D.C., and Johns Hopkins All Children's Hospital in St. Petersburg, Florida. Together, they form an academic health science center.

== Rankings and reputation ==
According to the Flexner Report, Hopkins has served as the model for American medical education.

Its major teaching hospital, the Johns Hopkins Hospital, was ranked one of the top hospitals in the United States by U.S. News & World Report. Was ranked #2 among research-oriented medical schools before formally withdrawing from participating in the U.S. News ranking system in 2023.

== Academics ==
=== Colleges Advisory Program ===
Upon matriculation, medical students at Johns Hopkins School of Medicine are divided into four colleges named after Hopkins faculty members who have had an impact in the history of medicine, Florence Sabin, Vivien Thomas, Daniel Nathans, and Helen Taussig. The colleges were established in 2005.

In each incoming class, 30 students are assigned to each college, and each college is further subdivided into six molecules of five students each. Each molecule is advised and taught by a faculty advisor, who instructs them in Clinical Foundations of Medicine, a core first-year course, and continues advising them throughout their four years of medical school. The family within each college of each molecule across the four years who belong to a given advisor is referred to as a macromolecule. Every year, the colleges compete in the "College Olympics" in late October, a competition that includes athletic events and sports, as well as art battles and dance-offs.

== Governance ==
The Johns Hopkins University School of Medicine is led by Ronald J. Daniels, president of Johns Hopkins University, and Theodore DeWeese, dean of the medical faculty and chief executive officer of Johns Hopkins Medicine. Kevin Sowers serves as president of Johns Hopkins Health System and executive vice president of Johns Hopkins Medicine.

== Notable people ==
=== Nobel laureates ===
As of 2026, the 17 out of the total 29 Nobel laureates associated with Johns Hopkins have come from the School of Medicine, including 15 out of the university's 18 laureates in Physiology or Medicine and 2 out of the 6 laureates for Chemistry. Two laureates, Peter Agre and Gregg Semenza, are current faculty at the School of Medicine.

The 1985 Nobel Peace Prize was awarded to International Physicians for the Prevention of Nuclear War (IPPNW). Two of the six founding members of the organization, Bernard Lown (M.D. 1945) and James E. Muller (M.D. 1969) were graduates of the Johns Hopkins School of Medicine.

- Gregg L. Semenza – Professor of Genetic Medicine (1990–present), Nobel Prize in Physiology or Medicine, 2019
- William Kaelin Jr. – Resident, Nobel Prize in Physiology or Medicine, 2019
- Carol Greider – Bloomberg Distinguished Professor (2014–2020), Nobel Prize in Physiology or Medicine, 2009
- Richard Axel – M.D. 1971, Nobel Prize in Physiology or Medicine, 2004
- Peter Agre – Bloomberg Distinguished Professor (2014–present), M.D. 1974, Nobel Prize in Chemistry, 2003
- David H. Hubel – Neuroscience Fellow (1958–59), former resident, Nobel Prize in Physiology or Medicine, 1981
- Torsten Wiesel – Assistant Professor (1958–59), Nobel Prize in Physiology or Medicine, 1981
- Hamilton O. Smith – Professor of Microbiology (1973–1998), M.D. 1956, Nobel Prize in Physiology or Medicine, 1978
- Daniel Nathans – Professor of Molecular Biology and Genetics (1967–1999), Nobel Prize in Physiology or Medicine, 1978
- Haldan Keffer Hartline – M.D. 1927, Nobel Prize in Physiology or Medicine, 1967
- Francis Peyton Rous – M.D. 1905, Nobel Prize in Physiology or Medicine, 1966
- Vincent du Vigneaud – National Research Council Fellow (1927-28) Nobel Prize in Chemistry, 1955
- Joseph Erlanger – Associate Professor of Physiology (1904–06), M.D. 1899, Nobel Prize in Physiology or Medicine, 1944
- Herbert Spencer Gasser – M.D. 1915, Nobel Prize in Physiology or Medicine, 1944
- George Minot – Resident, Nobel Prize in Physiology or Medicine, 1934
- George Whipple – Associate Professor in Pathology (1910–14), M.D. 1905, Nobel Prize in Physiology or Medicine, 1934

=== Notable faculty ===
- John Jacob Abel, pharmacologist, founder and chair of the first department of pharmacology in the U.S.
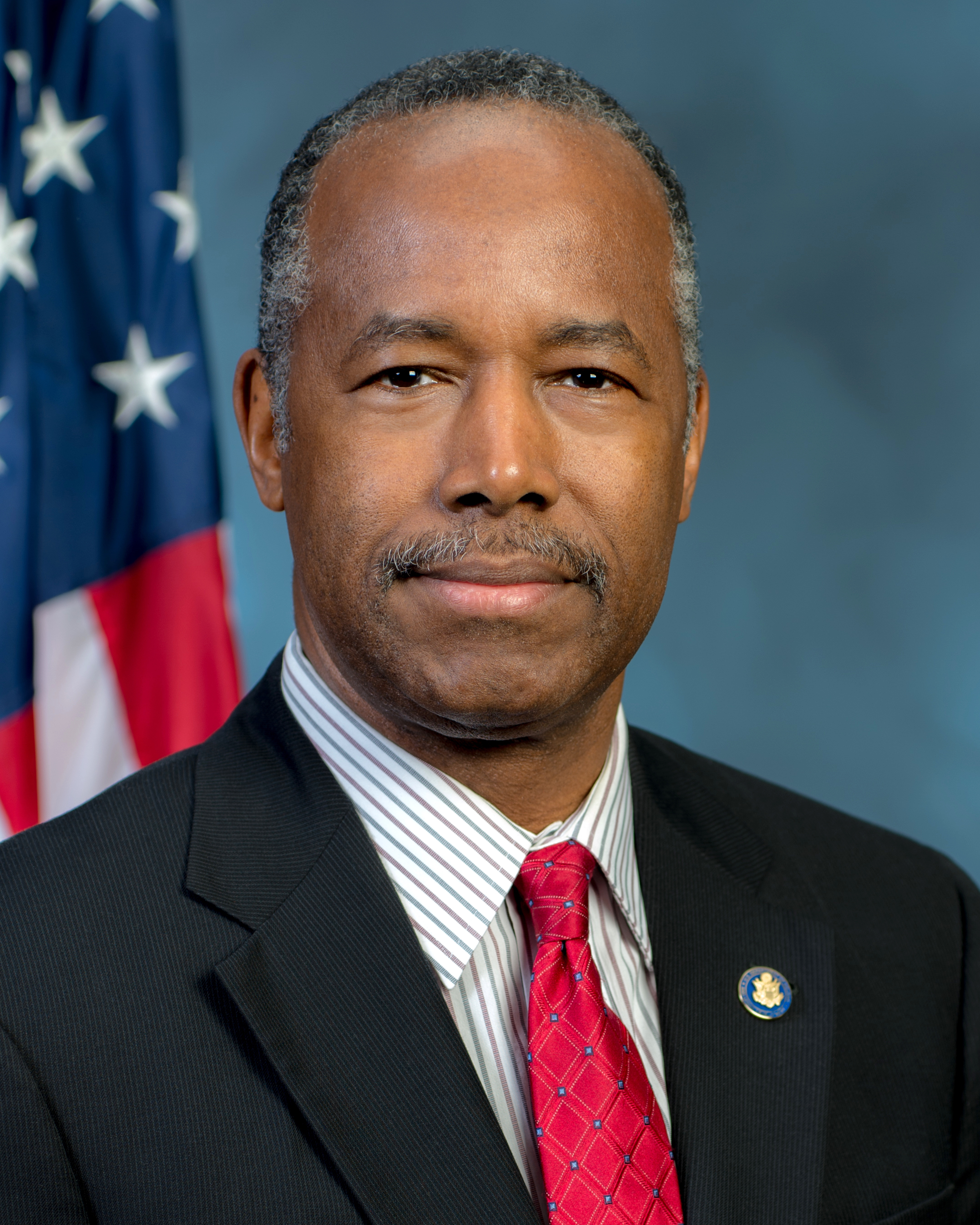
  Pediatric neurosurgeon and politician Ben Carson was a faculty member at the School of Medicine from 1984 to his retirement in 2013. He later went on to run as a candidate in the 2016 Republican Party presidential primaries and serve as United States Secretary of Housing and Urban Development.
- Alfred Blalock, developed field of cardiac surgery, including the Blalock–Taussig shunt
- William R. Brody, former radiologist-in-chief, former president of Johns Hopkins University (1996–2009), former president of the Salk Institute (2009–2015)
- Ben Carson, pediatric neurosurgeon, presidential candidate, former U.S. Secretary of Housing and Urban Development
- George Otto Gey, researcher who first isolated HeLa cells from the tumor tissue of Henrietta Lacks, a cancer patient at Johns Hopkins
- William Halsted, considered the "father of modern surgery" and one of four founders of Johns Hopkins Medicine
- Leo Kanner, "father of child psychiatry" who first described autism in Autistic Disturbances of Affective Contact, published in 1943
- Howard Kelly, physician credited with establishing gynecology as a specialty
- Marty Makary, Commissioner of the U.S. Food and Drug Administration (FDA)
- Victor A. McKusick, developed the field of medical genetics and founded OMIM, received Albert Lasker Special Achievement Award
- John Money, psychologist and sexologist who pioneered gender identity research, coining the terms gender role and sexual orientation
- William Osler, considered the "father of modern medicine", discovered Osler–Weber–Rendu syndrome, a hereditary hemorrhagic telangiectasia
- Solomon H. Snyder, neuroscientist, Albert Lasker Award for Basic Medical Research for his research on the opioid receptor
- Vivien Thomas, the surgical technician and one of the namesakes of the Blalock-Taussig-Thomas shunt. Thomas, an African-American, did not initially receive credit due to racial discrimination. His story was detailed in the 2004 HBO documentary Something the Lord Made
- Bert Vogelstein, oncologist and pioneer in cancer genetics, first explained the role of p53 in cancer
- William H. Welch, pathologist known as the dean of American Medicine, and the first Dean of Johns Hopkins School of Medicine

=== Notable alumni ===
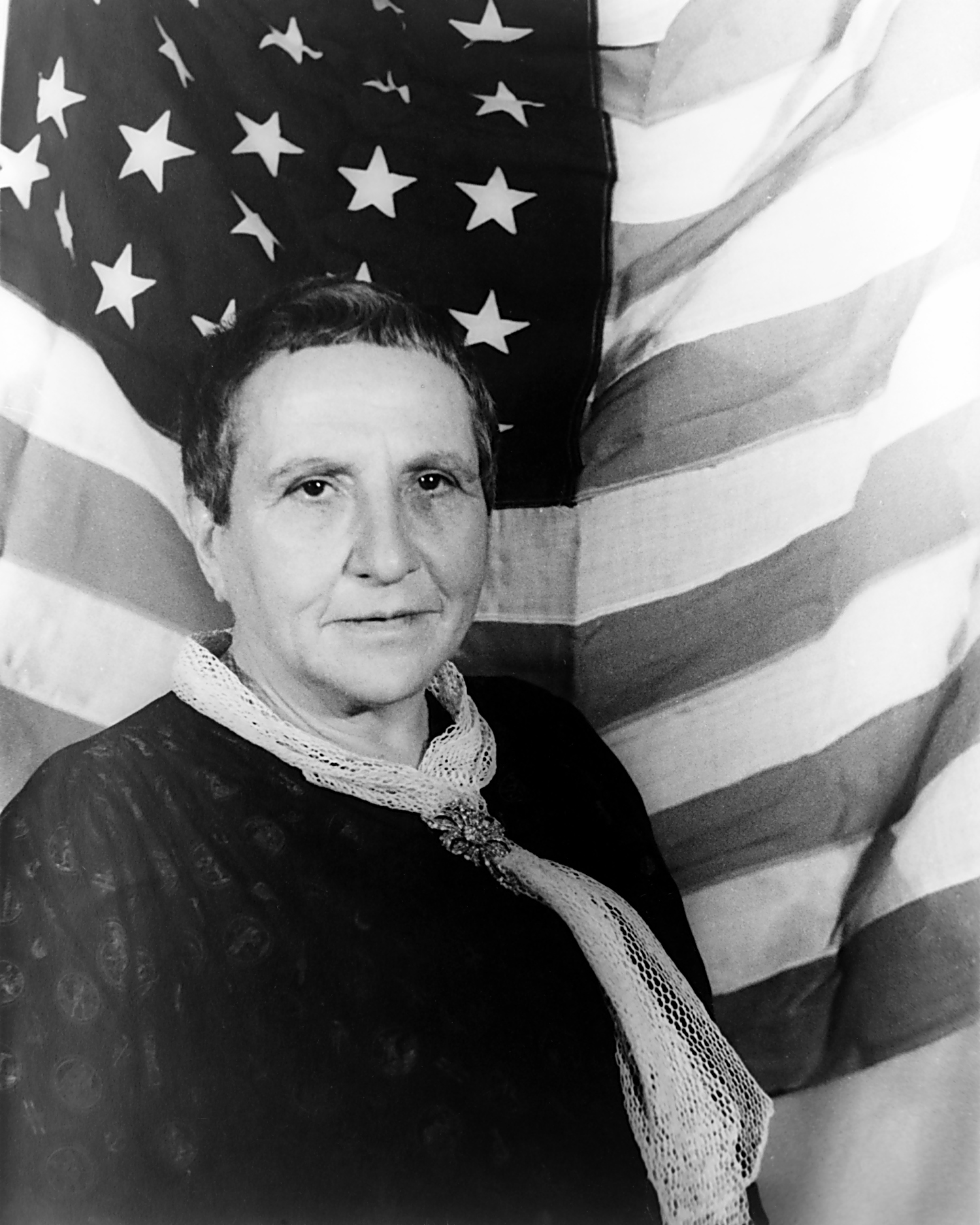
Acclaimed American novelist, writer, and playwright Gertrude Stein attended but did not graduate from the Johns Hopkins University School of Medicine.

- Dorothy Hansine Andersen, identified cystic fibrosis and Andersen's disease
- Hugh Grosvenor Calkins, Catherine Ellen Poindexter Professor of Cardiology
- George G. Glenner, research pathologist who identified beta-amyloid, a protein associated with Alzheimer's disease
- Andy Harris, U.S. Representative for Maryland's 1st Congressional District since 2011
- Harry Klinefelter, rheumatologist, endocrinologist, and namesake of Klinefelter syndrome
- Louise Branscomb, physician and surgeon
- Leroy Hood, invented automated DNA and protein sequencing, Lasker Award winner
- Maclyn McCarty, his 1944 experiment helped demonstrate that genes were made of DNA, rather than protein, first recipient of the Albert Lasker Special Achievement Award
- Wilder Penfield, pioneer of epilepsy neurosurgery who developed the cortical homunculus
- Peter Pronovost, former anesthesiology faculty, Time 100 in 2008, authored over 800 articles and book chapters on patient safety, advisor to the World Health Organization's World Alliance for Patient Safety
- Dorothy Reed Mendenhall, pathologist and namesake of Reed–Sternberg cell in Hodgkin's lymphoma
- Florence Sabin, first woman to hold a full professorship at a medical school, Albert Lasker Public Service Award for public health activism in her home state Colorado
- Gertrude Stein, novelist, poet, and playwright
- Rochelle Walensky, Director of the United States Centers for Disease Control and Prevention (CDC)
- Gregory House, head of the Department of Diagnostic Medicine at the Princeton-Plainsboro Teaching Hospital

== Philanthropy ==
In July 2024, businessman and former New York City mayor Michael Bloomberg announced a $1 billion gift to his alma mater Johns Hopkins University to make tuition free for all medical school students whose families make under $300,000 a year, beginning in the fall of 2024.

== In popular culture ==
- The ABC documentary series Hopkins takes a look at the life of the medical staff and students of the Johns Hopkins Hospital and Health System. This 2008 series is a sequel to the 2000 ABC special Hopkins 24/7. Both Hopkins and Hopkins 24/7 were awarded the Peabody Award.
- The movie Something the Lord Made is the story of two men – an ambitious white surgeon, head of surgery at the Johns Hopkins Hospital, and a gifted black carpenter turned lab technician – who defied the racial strictures of the Jim Crow South and together pioneered the field of heart surgery.
