= Christopher K. Glass =

American biophysicist

Christopher Kevin Glass (born 1955, California, US) is an American biophysicist, holding the titles of Distinguished Professor of Cellular and Molecular Medicine and Distinguished Professor of Medicine at the University of California, San Diego He works on the molecular mechanisms that control macrophage functions in health and disease.

Glass studied biophysics at the University of California, Berkeley (1977) and received M.D. and Ph.D. degrees from the University of California, San Diego (1984). He performed internship and residency training in internal medicine at Brigham and Women's Hospital in Boston (1985) before returning to UC San Diego for fellowship training in Endocrinology and Metabolism (1989). He became one of the founding members of the Department of Cellular and Molecular Medicine In 1992 he was appointed assistant professor of medicine at UCSD, and promoted to associate professor in 1995, full professor in 1999, and Distinguished Professor in 2018

Glass is a member of the American Academy of Arts and Sciences, the National Academy of Medicine, and the National Academy of Sciences.

== Research interests ==
Recent work from the laboratory reported the importance of tissue-specific signals in establishing the diverse macrophage phenotypes observed in different organs including microglia, the major macrophage population in the brain.

== Awards and honors ==
- 1989 Wilson S. Stone Award for the M.D. Andersen Cancer Center
- 2008 Honorary Doctorate of Medicine, University of Linköping, Sweden
- 2014 Election to American Academy of Arts and Sciences
- 2015 Election to National Academy of Medicine (formerly Institute of Medicine)
- 2017 Election to National Academy of Sciences

== Most cited publications ==
Glass has an h-index of over 100. His most cited publications are:

- Heinz, Sven; Benner, Christopher; Spann, Nathanael; Bertolino, Eric; Lin, Yin C.; Laslo, Peter; Cheng, Jason X.; Murre, Cornelis; Singh, Harinder; Glass, Christopher K. (May 28, 2010). "Simple combinations of lineage-determining transcription factors prime cis-regulatory elements required for macrophage and B cell identities". Molecular Cell. 38 (4): 576–589. doi:10.1016/j.molcel.2010.05.004. PMC 2898526. PMID 20513432. – Cited 6487 times according to Google Scholar.
- Ricote, M.; Li, A. C.; Willson, T. M.; Kelly, C. J.; Glass, C. K. (January 1, 1998). "The peroxisome proliferator-activated receptor-gamma is a negative regulator of macrophage activation". Nature. 391 (6662): 79–82. Bibcode:1998Natur.391...79R. doi:10.1038/34178. PMID 9422508. S2CID 4421986. – Cited 4118 times according to Google Scholar.
- Glass, C. K.; Witztum, J. L. (February 23, 2001). "Atherosclerosis. the road ahead". Cell. 104 (4): 503–516. doi:10.1016/s0092-8674(01)00238-0. PMID 11239408. S2CID 18061361. – Cited 3831 times according to Google Scholar.
