= Hypoxia-inducible factor-asparagine dioxygenase =

Identifiers
- EC no.: 1.14.11.30

Databases
- IntEnz: IntEnz view
- BRENDA: BRENDA entry
- ExPASy: NiceZyme view
- KEGG: KEGG entry
- MetaCyc: metabolic pathway
- PRIAM: profile
- PDB structures: RCSB PDB PDBe PDBsum
Search
- PMC: articles
- PubMed: articles
- NCBI: proteins

Hypoxia-inducible factor-asparagine dioxygenase (EC 1.14.11.30, HIF hydroxylase) is an enzyme with systematic name hypoxia-inducible factor-L-asparagine, 2-oxoglutarate:oxygen oxidoreductase (4-hydroxylating). This enzyme catalyses the following chemical reaction:

hypoxia-inducible factor-L-asparagine + 2-oxoglutarate + O_{2} $\rightleftharpoons$ hypoxia-inducible factor-(3S)-3-hydroxy-L-asparagine + succinate + CO_{2}

Hypoxia-inducible factor-asparagine dioxygenase contains iron, and requires ascorbate.
