= Edwards Lifesciences =

American biotechnology company

Edwards Lifesciences Corporation
- Type: Public
- Traded as: NYSE: EW; S&P 500 component
- Industry: Medical technology
- Founded: 1958; 68 years ago
- Headquarters: Irvine, California, U.S.
- Area served: Worldwide
- Key people: Bernard J. Zovighian (CEO)
- Products: Heart valves; Surgical valve technologies; Implantable heart failure management
- Revenue: ▲US$6.07 billion (2025)
- Operating income: ▼US$1.26 billion (2025)
- Net income: ▼US$1.07 billion (2025)
- Total assets: ▲US$13.7 billion (2025)
- Total equity: ▲US$10.3 billion (2025)
- Number of employees: 16,000 (2025)
- Website: edwards.com

Edwards Lifesciences Corporation is an American medical technology company headquartered in Irvine, California, specializing in tissue heart valves and transcatheter technologies for the treatment of structural heart disease. The company has manufacturing facilities at the Irvine headquarters, as well as in Draper, Utah; Costa Rica; Singapore; and Limerick, Ireland. The company is also constructing a manufacturing plant in Moncada, near Valencia, Spain, with a €150 million investment. Production is scheduled to begin in 2027.

== History ==
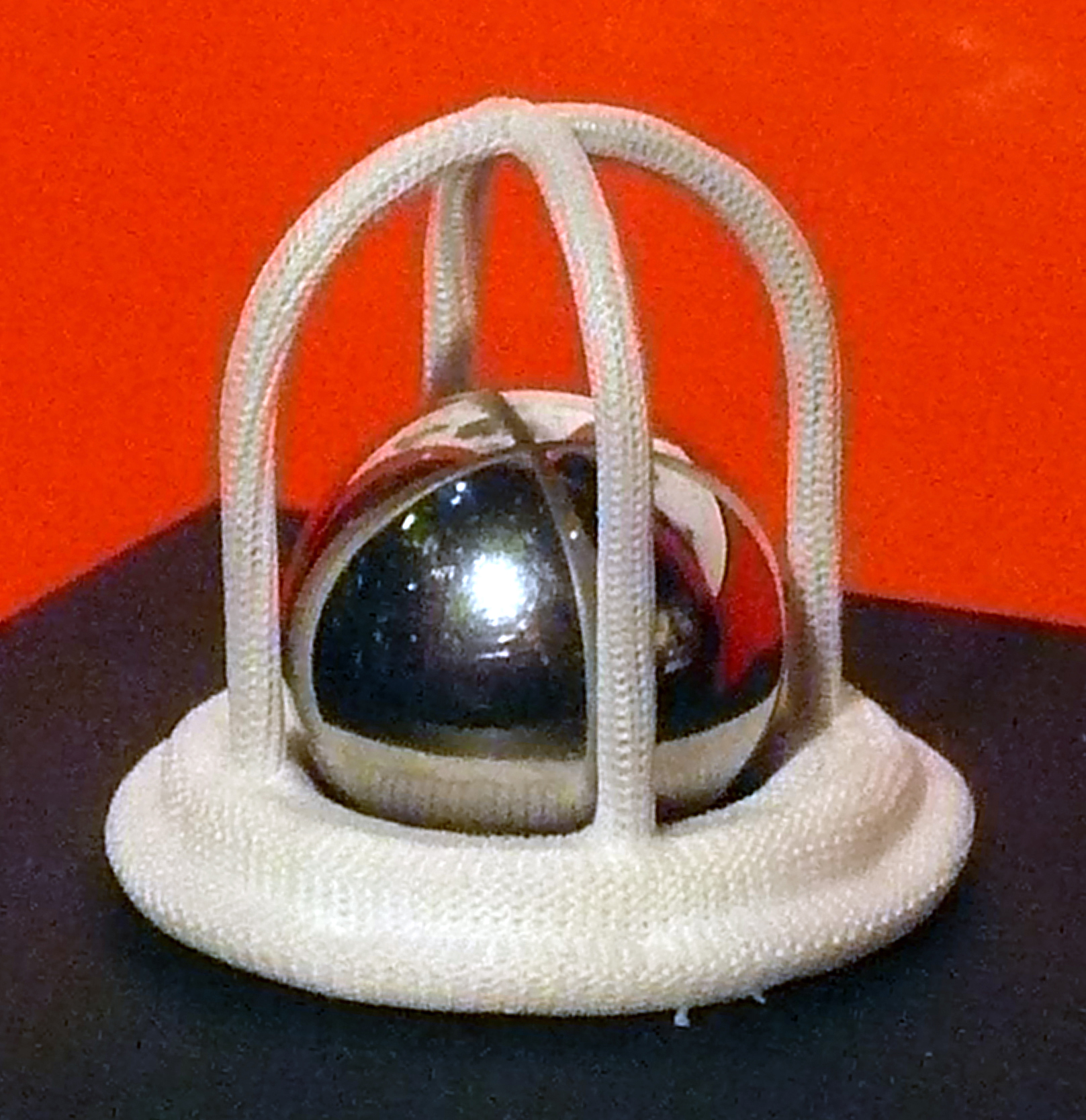
The Starr-Edwards caged ball valve.

Edwards Lifesciences was originally founded by electrical engineer Miles "Lowell" Edwards in 1958, a graduate of Oregon State University. Edwards invented the first medically proven and adopted artificial heart valve. Dr. Albert Starr, a surgeon at the Oregon Health and Sciences University, is credited as the first to successfully implant the Starr-Edwards mitral valve in a patient in 1960. As a result of the successful heart implant, Edwards established manufacturing in Santa Ana, California the same year to continue his research in pulmonary devices.

Edwards' valves are still in operation today. An early patient lived a record 48 years with the implant before requiring a replacement.

Edwards was acquired by Baxter in 1985. It was spun off from Baxter in 2000.

In 2017, Edwards completed the acquisition of Valtech Cardio for $340 million. Also in 2017, Edwards acquired Harpoon Medical of Baltimore, Maryland for $100 million. Harpoon, founded in 2013, developed a minimally invasive heart surgery product for mitral valve repair to treat degenerative mitral regurgitation. At the time of the acquisition, the product was not available on any market.

On April 18, 2019, Edwards completed the acquisition of CAS Medical Systems of Branford, Connecticut for ~$100 million.

Edwards Sapien 3 and Sapien 3 Ultra Transcatheter Heart Valve systems were FDA-approved for the treatment of patients at low risk for death or major complications associated with open-heart surgery on August 16, 2019. These products are used to treat patients with severe aortic stenosis without utilizing open-heart surgery.

In 2020, Edwards co-sponsored the Virtual ISPOR-FDA Summit centered on patient preference information in medical device regulatory decisions.

In December 2021, the FDA approved the SAPIEN 3 transcatheter valve in combination with the Alterra adaptive prestent for the treatment of severe pulmonary regurgitation.

In February 2024, the FDA approved Edwards' EVOQUE tricuspid valve replacement system, the first transcatheter therapy approved in the United States for the treatment of tricuspid regurgitation. In May 2024, Edwards launched the SAPIEN 3 Ultra RESILIA valve in Europe.

In June 2024, the company received FDA approval for a new implant designed to manage heart failure issues, called the Cordella pulmonary artery sensor.

In July 2024, Edwards made agreements with Affluent Medical for an equity stake, IP licensing and an exclusive option to acquire its Kephalios subsidiary. The same month, Edwards announced it would acquire Innovalve Bio Medical for approximately $300 million, and JenaValve Technology and Endotronix for $1.2 billion.

In August 2024, Edwards acquired JC Medical from Genesis MedTech, gaining its J-Valve transcatheter aortic valve replacement system for the treatment of aortic regurgitation.

In 2023, Edwards announced that its critical care business unit would be spun off into a separate entity. In June 2024 Edwards instead agreed to sell the unit to BD for $4.2 billion. The sale closed on September 3, 2024.

In May 2025, the FDA approved the SAPIEN 3 platform, including the SAPIEN 3, SAPIEN 3 Ultra, and SAPIEN 3 Ultra RESILIA valves, for the treatment of severe aortic stenosis in asymptomatic patients, marking the first FDA approval of TAVR therapy for this patient population.

In September 2025, Edwards completed the full acquisition of heart failure monitoring company Vectorious Medical Technologies.

In January 2026, the FDA approved the SAPIEN M3 mitral valve replacement system, the first transcatheter mitral valve replacement therapy using a transseptal approach to receive FDA approval for the treatment of mitral regurgitation.

== Business segments ==
Prior to September 2024, its products were categorized into four areas: surgical valve technologies, transcatheter heart valves, transcatheter mitral and tricuspid therapies, and critical care. In September 2024, Edwards completed the sale of its Critical Care product group to BD. Since September 2024, its products are categorized into four areas: surgical valve technologies, transcatheter heart valves, transcatheter mitral and tricuspid therapies, and implantable heart failure management (IHFM).

=== Transcatheter Heart Valve ===
The company's SAPIEN family of transcatheter aortic heart valves is made of bovine pericardial tissue mounted within a balloon-expandable, cobalt-chromium frame and is deployed via catheter. Edwards introduced the transcatheter heart valve replacement procedure to U.S. patients unable to undergo open-heart surgery with FDA approval of the SAPIEN transcatheter valve in 2011. The indication was expanded in November 2012 to include patients at a high risk for death or serious complications associated with open-heart surgery. In 2021, the FDA cleared Edwards’ SAPIEN 3 transcatheter valve with the Alterra adaptive prestent for pulmonic heart valve replacement. In May 2024, Edwards launched the SAPIEN 3 Ultra RESILIA valve in Europe.

=== Transcatheter Mitral and Tricuspid Therapies ===
The Transcatheter Mitral and Tricuspid Therapies business segment develops transcatheter heart valve repair and replacement technologies to treat mitral and tricuspid valve diseases. In September 2022, the FDA approved Edwards' PASCAL Precision transcatheter valve repair system for the treatment of degenerative mitral regurgitation.

=== Surgical ===
The Surgical business segment involves the use of Edwards' RESILIA tissue technology, developed to help limit valve calcification. Edwards estimates that more than 450,000 patients around the world have either undergone SAVR or TAVR with an Edwards RESILIA valve.

=== Critical Care ===
Before its sale, the Critical Care business segment included pulmonary artery catheters, disposable pressure transducers and advanced hemodynamic monitoring systems. The portfolio also included a line of balloon catheter-based vascular products, surgical clips and inserts. In 2023, it was announced that the critical care business unit was to be spun off into its own entity, however in 2024 the critical care department was purchased by BD for $4.2 billion.

== Organizational culture ==
=== Edwards Lifesciences Foundation ===
The Edwards Lifesciences Foundation launched in 2014 and supports programs designed to treat underserved people to reduce heart valve disease.

Since the initiative launched in 2014, Edwards and its foundation have contributed more than $100 million in financial and technology donations through "Every Heartbeat Matters" (EHM), reaching over 4 million underserved structural heart patients globally.
