= Mitral annular calcification =

- Other names: Mitral annulus calcification
- Specialty: Cardiology

Mitral annular calcification (MAC) is a multifactorial chronic degenerative process in which calcium with lipid is deposited (calcified) in the annular fibrosa ring of the heart's mitral valve. MAC was first discovered and described in 1908 by M. Bonninger in the journal Deutsche Medizinische Wochenschrift. In the majority of cases, affected patients are asymptomatic and the condition is only noted incidentally on echocardiography or computed tomography (CT) scans. However, mitral annular calcification remains clinically significant because while in many cases the calcification is limited to the annulus and proximal leaflet bases, it may also extend further into the valve structure. This may potentially cause mitral regurgitation (MR) or more rarely mitral stenosis (MS), which may produce the classic symptoms of these conditions over time. In addition, calcification of the annulus can inhibit electrical conduction of the AV node, consequently causing various degrees of heart block. While MAC does not usually necessitate treatment independently, the degree of calcification present in the annulus is an important factor in choosing the most appropriate treatment modality for several conditions that do require intervention, particularly those that cause symptomatic obstruction of left ventricular outflow (LVOT).

== Pathophysiology ==
Most often a type of dystrophic calcification, the initial stage of MAC may begin with microscopic tissue damage to the endothelial cells of the annulus fibrosis, prompting changes that result in the atherosclerosis-like deposition of lipids and ultimately calcification of these areas. This explains why MAC is commonly seen in individuals of advanced age or those having an underlying genetic or inflammatory condition that predisposes to tissue damage (see associated causes below). It is also associated with conditions that cause Left Ventricular Hypertrophy, likely because the resulting mechanical stress on the cardiac tissues also predisposes to annulus damage from increasingly turbulent blood flow.

== Diagnosis ==
As in most types of calcific valve disease, echocardiography plays the major role in detecting MAC and grading its severity and complications, particularly mitral regurgitation and/or mitral stenosis as mentioned above. If mitral regurgitation is suspected clinically, transesophageal echocardiogram (TEE) may be needed, as the shadowing of the left atrium seen in a transthoracic echocardiogram often impairs the assessment of the degree of calcification present. However, in both MS and MR, (preferably color) doppler flow gradients are used to estimate the degree of dysfunction caused by MAC. Because calcifications are highly radiopaque, MAC can also be well visualized on computed tomography. Typically, intravenous contrast is used to assist in the differentiation of valvular structures along with ECG-gating to correct for artifact from the heart’s constant motion. In contrast, calcifications are relatively poorly visualized on MRI, so cardiac MRI is not typically used in the evaluation of MAC.

== Epidemiology ==
The overall prevalence of MAC is estimated at 10%. Interestingly, the two annuli of the mitral valve are not affected equally, with the posterior annulus demonstrating calcification more frequently than the anterior annulus. When MAC does result in mitral stenosis (MS), it does not produce the classical fusion of the commissures seen in rheumatic heart disease, which allows these two common underlying causes of MS to be differentiated.

== Associations/Causes ==
Some of the causes of MAC are:

- age-related factors
- atherosclerosis
- increased stress on the mitral valve resulting from high blood pressure, aortic stenosis or hypertrophic cardiomyopathy
- abnormal calcium-phosphorus metabolism
- Chronic kidney disease/ESRD
- genetic disorders such as marfan syndrome, mitral valve prolapse, hurler syndrome
- female gender
