= Mitral valve annuloplasty =

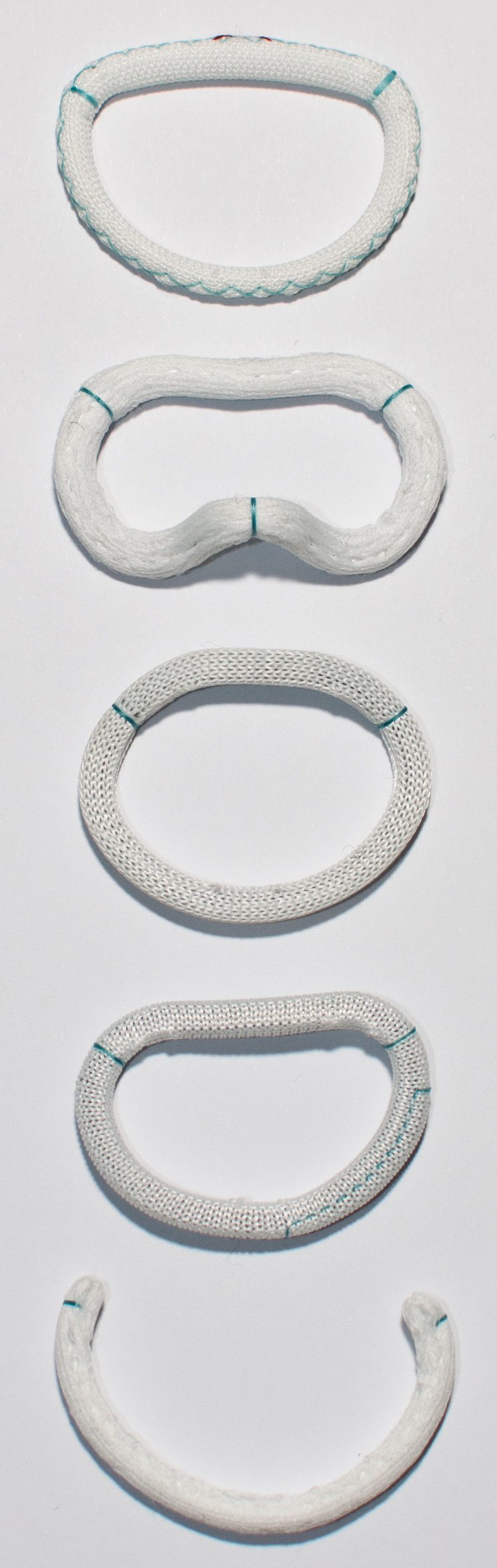
- Examples of commercially available annuloplasty rings. From top: St. Judes Rigid Saddle Shaped Ring, Edwards Geoform, Edwards Physio, Edwards ETlogix, Edwards Cosgrove.
- Specialty: Cardiology

Mitral valve annuloplasty is a surgical technique for the repair of leaking mitral valves. Due to various factors, the two leaflets normally involved in sealing the mitral valve to retrograde flow may not coapt properly. Surgical repair typically involves the implantation of a device surrounding the mitral valve, called an annuloplasty device, which pulls the leaflets together to facilitate coaptation and aids to re-establish mitral valve function.

== Need ==
Mitral regurgitation is the most common form of mitral valve dysfunction. Today more than 2.5 million Americans are estimated to be affected by mitral regurgitation. This number is expected to double by the year 2030. Every year, 300,000 people worldwide undergo open heart surgery for mitral valve repair, 44,000 people in the US alone.

== Relevance ==
Since it was initially established 40 years ago by Professor Alain Carpentier, mitral valve annuloplasty has been continuously improved and is considered the gold standard for the treatment of most etiologies of mitral valve dysfunction today.

== Rationale ==
The goal of mitral valve annuloplasty is to regain mitral valve competence by restoring the physiological form and function of the normal mitral valve apparatus. Under normal conditions the mitral valve undergoes significant dynamic changes in shape and size throughout the cardiac cycle. These changes are primarily due to the dynamic motion of the surrounding mitral valve annulus, a collageneous structure which attaches the mitral leaflets and the left atrium to the ostium of the left ventricle and the aortic root.

Throughout the cardiac cycle, the annulus undergoes a sphincter motion, narrowing down the orifice area during systole to facilitate coaptation of the two leaflets and widens during diastole to allow for easy diastolic filling of the left ventricle. This motion is further enhanced by a pronounced three-dimensional configuration during systole, the characteristic saddle shape. These changes throughout the cycle are believed to be key to optimize leaflet coaptation and to minimize tissue stresses. The challenge of mitral valve annuloplasty is to improve the diseased and distorted shape of the mitral valve and to reestablish the physiological configuration, while preserving normal annular dynamics. Today, cardiac surgeons can select from a variety of annuloplasty devices, flexible, semi-rigid, or rigid, incomplete or complete, planar or saddle-shaped, adjustable and non-adjustable. While the general goal of all devices is the same, namely to increase leaflet coaptation and to support the posterior annulus against dilation, flexible bands are designed to maintain the three-dimensional contour of the native annulus and some of its natural dynamics. The goal of semi-rigid rings is to maintain coaptation and valve integrity during systole, while allowing for good hemodynamics during diastole. Rigid rings are designed to provide rigid support in large dilation and under high-pressure.

== Sizing ==
Annuloplasty devices usually come in different sizes. The surgeon can estimate the dimensions of the patient’s mitral valve and decide on an appropriate ring size. Depending on the disease etiology, different approaches are taken. Surgeons can decide to "undersize" the device, "truesize" the device, or "oversize" it.

== Device classification and regulatory considerations ==
Annuloplasty devices are classified by the U.S. Food and Drug Administration (FDA) as class II medical devices.
