= Albert Starr =

American surgeon (1926–2024)

Albert Starr (June 1, 1926 – December 11, 2024) was an American cardiovascular surgeon and was the first surgeon to successfully implant the Starr-Edwards heart valve surgically. Starr resided and practiced in the Portland, Oregon, area and was special adviser to OHSU Dean of Medicine Mark Richardson and OHSU President Joseph Robertson (OHSU) at Oregon Health and Science University. He worked closely with the inventor of the Star-Edwards heart valve, Miles “Lowell” Edwards, to test the device and ensure its safety before its first use.

== Education ==
Starr was born in New York, New York, on June 1, 1926 and educated in New York public schools.

He received his B.A. degree from Columbia University in 1946 and his M.D. degree from Columbia College of Physicians and Surgeons in 1949.

He then went on to do his internship at Johns Hopkins Hospital under Alfred Blalock, which he completed in 1950.

== Residency and M.A.S.H. ==
He completed his residency in general and thoracic surgery at the Bellevue and Presbyterian Hospitals of Columbia University. During his residency, he was drafted for surgical service during the Korean War. At times surrounded by enemy forces, he started as a battalion surgeon near the front lines. He transferred to the 8076 Mobile Army Surgical Hospital.

While a surgeon in a M.A.S.H. unit in Korea, he did near 1,000 laparotomies in 1 year, at the age of 23. He was also head of the abdominal team.

He resumed training in New York in 1953, and completed his residency in 1957.

== Columbia and OHSU ==
He was an assistant in surgeon at Columbia University until 1957, when he moved to Oregon, having been recruited to create the first open-heart surgery program at the University of Oregon Medical School. He was enticed, in part, by the Oregon Heart Association's promises to help fund his research and provide recreational opportunities to enjoy the state's exceptional salmon fishing. There he worked for the Crippled Children's Division at the Oregon Health and Science University (known then as the University of Oregon Medical School).

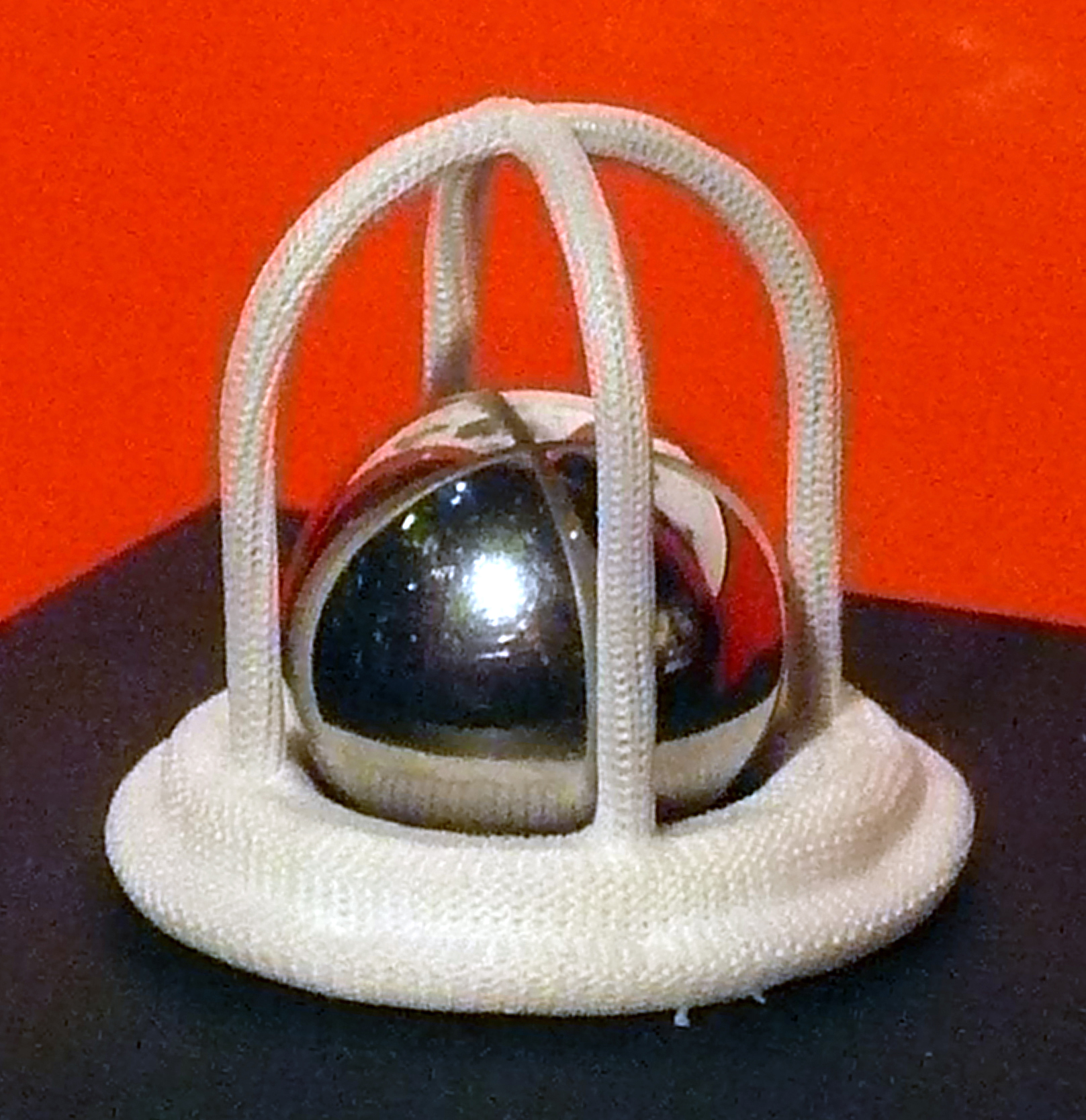
Starr-Edwards mitral valve

Starr is credited with successfully implanting the world's first medically proven and adopted artificial mitral valve and developing the first surgical procedures for the design in 1960. Starr was an instructor in surgery when he met Lowell Edwards in September 1958, who helped him design a new medical device for mitral valve surgery. Starr has said of this meeting, "He was in his 60s and I was in my 30s, but there was no generation gap between us."

In 1960, he performed the world's first successful artificial mitral valve implant, at OHSU. Starting in 1960, Edwards incorporated Edwards Laboratories, which manufactured and marketed the Starr-Edwards valve. By 2024, the valve had been implanted in 800,000 people. In 1963, Starr performed the world's first successful triple valve replacement. He led OHSU's heart surgery program until 1964. That year, he began leading a joint cardiac surgery program for both OHSU and Providence Health System in Portland. He performed the first heart transplant in Oregon at OHSU in 1985.

He was named director of the Providence Health System Heart & Vascular Institute in 1986. He became the institute's director of bioscience research and development in 2004, before returning full-time to OHSU in 2011 as a professor. He was a professor emeritus of surgery at the university until his death in 2024. In 2012, he became chairman of OHSU's new Knight Cardiovascular Institute.

Starr died on December 11, 2024, at the age of 98.

== Awards ==
1972: Golden Plate Award of the American Academy of Achievement
2007: Lasker Award
2015: Scientific Grand Prize of the Lefoulon-Delalande Fondation

== See also ==
- Mitral valve replacement

== Bibliography ==
- Borghi L. (2015) "Heart Matters. The Collaboration Between Surgeons and Engineers in the Rise of Cardiac Surgery". In: Pisano R. (eds) A Bridge between Conceptual Frameworks. History of Mechanism and Machine Science, vol 27. Springer, Dordrecht, pp. 53-68
- A.M.Matthews, The development of the Starr-Edwards heart valve, Tex Heart Inst J. 1998; 25(4): 282–293
