= Focus assessed transthoracic echocardiography =

- Purpose: type of transthoracic echocardiogram,

Focus assessed transthoracic echocardiography (or FATE) is a type of transthoracic echocardiogram, or sonogram of the heart, often performed by non-cardiologist. The protocol has been used since 1989 and has four projections; subcostal four-chamber, apical four-chamber, parasternal long axis and parasternal short axis.

The original focused cardiac ultrasound protocol for non-cardiologists was devised by Dr Erik Sloth in 1989 and has formed the basis of hands-on FATE courses ever since.

The success of the original protocol has inspired a surge of replicas in many shapes and the coining of many imaginative acronyms: FEER, FEEL, Focus, Bleep, HART, FUSE etc. These are all variations of the original theme [1].

== Gallery ==
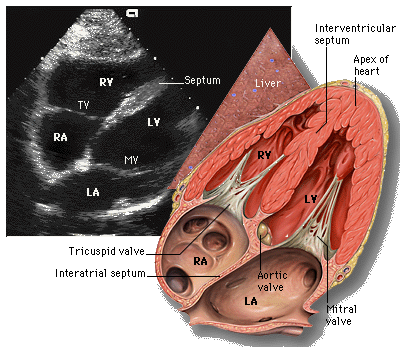
Subcostal four chamber

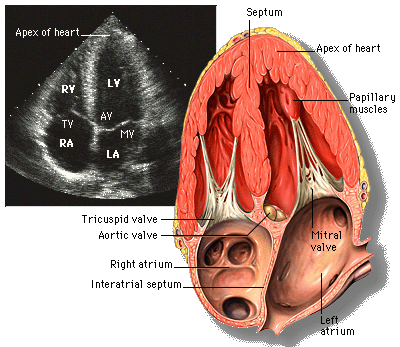
Apical four chamber

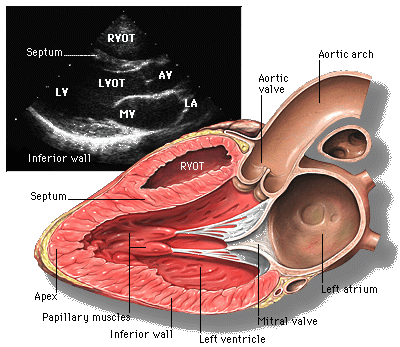
Parasternal long axis

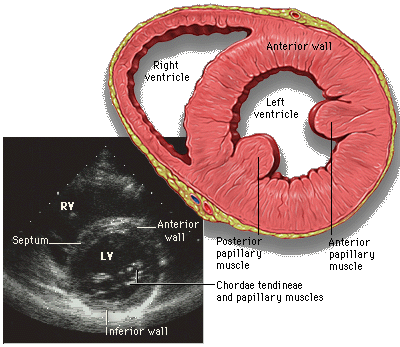
Parasternal short axis

Each figure contains a TTE with a black background, and a corresponding colored illustration.
Patrick J. Lynch and C. Carl Jaffe, Yale University, 2006.
Click on a figure to enlarge it and see some parts of the heart identified. RV, right ventricle; LV, left ventricle; RA, right atrium; LA, left atrium; TV, tricuspid valve; MV, mitral valve; AV, aortic valve; RVOT, right ventricular outflow tract; LVOT, left ventricular outflow tract

== See also ==
- Echocardiography
