= Sternal saw =

Surgical Instrument

A sternal saw is a bone cutter used to perform median sternotomy, opening the patient's chest by splitting the breastbone, or sternum. It is a reciprocating blade saw that resembles a jigsaw in appearance. It was invented and introduced by Dr. Edward P. ("Ted") Diethrich in 1963 (see picture of the device in the following external link: ).

== See also ==
- Instruments used in general surgery
