= Minimally invasive cardiac surgery =

- Other names: MICS CABG, MIMVS
- Specialty: Cardiology

Minimally invasive cardiac surgery, encompasses various aspects of cardiac surgical procedures (aortic valve replacement, mitral valve repair, coronary artery bypass surgery, ascending aorta or aortic root surgery) that can be performed with minimally invasive approach either via mini-thoracotomy or mini-sternotomy. MICS CABG (Minimally Invasive Cardiac Surgery/Coronary Artery Bypass Grafting) or the McGinn technique is heart surgery performed through several small incisions instead of the traditional open-heart surgery that requires a median sternotomy approach, and can be performed in patients with multivessel coronary artery disease. MICS CABG is a beating-heart multi-vessel procedure performed under direct vision through an anterolateral mini-thoracotomy.

Advantages of minimally invasive heart surgery are less blood loss, reduced post-operative discomfort, faster postoperative recovery and lower risk of infections, reduced duration of mechanical ventilation as well as eliminating the possibility for sternal non-union. This procedure makes heart surgery possible for patients who were previously considered too high risk for traditional surgery due to age or medical history. Patients referred for this procedure may have coronary artery disease (CAD); aortic, mitral or tricuspid valve diseases; or previous unsuccessful stenting.

A recent meta-analysis of randomized controlled trials by Amin et al (2024) showed that minimally invasive mitral valve surgery (MIMVS) reduced the number of days spent in the hospital and demonstrated a trend towards lower postoperative pain scores, but it did not decrease the risk of all-cause mortality or the number of patients needing blood product transfusions.

== The procedure ==
MICS CABG is performed through one 5–7 cm incision in the 4th intercostal space (ICS). In some cases the thoracotomy may be necessary in the 5th ICS instead. A soft tissue refractor is used to allow for greater visibility and access. MICS CABG may be completed in an "anaortic" or no-touch off-pump technique, which has demonstrated reduced postoperative stroke and mortality compared to traditional CABG.

Two access incisions are also made at the 6th intercostal space and xiphoid process to allow for instruments to position and stabilize the heart.

== The McGinn Technique (Proximal Anastomoses) ==
The McGinn proximal technique is performed with the blood pressure lowered to 90-100 systolic which reduces stress to the aorta. A series of tools are used to position and stabilize vessels. The technique uses devices to support the surrounding heart tissues while vital surgery takes place. This is also known as off-pump CABG (OPCAB). OPCAB voids the use of cardiopulmonary bypass (CPB), which requires the heart to be stopped (arrested) with cardioplegia solution. Off-pump is also known as beating heart surgery.

Minimally invasive heart surgery has been used as an alternative to traditional surgery for the following procedures:

- Coronary artery bypass
- Mitral valve repair
- Mitral valve replacement
- Aortic valve replacement
- Atrial septal defects
- Hybrid coronary revascularization

== Pump-assisted beating heart bypass ==
A cannula with a pump and vacuum action is fed up through an artery in the groin to reduce the stress on the heart so that it may still function during the operation. This pump flows at 2-3 liters per minute to support circulation and eliminates the need for cardioplegia to arrest the heart.

== Hybrid coronary revascularization ==
Hybrid coronary revascularization is a common procedure that takes advantage of coronary stenting in combination with CABG. Hybrid coronary bypass is a relatively new procedure and alternative to traditional bypass surgery that is defined by the performance of coronary bypass surgery and coronary stenting of different areas of a patient's heart. MICS CABG allows utilization of the left internal mammary artery (IMA; aka left internal thoracic artery, left ITA) to bypass the left anterior descending artery (LAD), which is termed as left IMA-LAD, as a preferable anastomosis whenever indicated and technically feasible (Loop et al.) and has been proven to benefit in event free survival (Acinapura et al.). The other one or two arteries will be stented, when appropriate, allowing cardiologists and cardiothoracic surgeons to work together.

== After surgery ==
After a minimally invasive procedure, patients recover more quickly than from sternotomy and develop fewer complications. Most patients can expect to resume everyday activities within a few weeks of their operation. After surgery, patients are administered an anaesthetic pain pump and drains that will be removed prior to discharge. Patients are encouraged to move around as much as possible after their operation to recover quickly. Once discharged from hospital, patients require no further post-operative assistance.

Minimally invasive heart surgery is a safe and broadly applicable technique for performing a wide range of complex heart procedures, including single or multiple heart valve procedures, bypass surgery, and congenital heart repairs.

== Benefits of MICS CABG/ The McGinn Technique ==
Eliminating the need for median sternotomy greatly reduces the trauma and pain associated with open-chest surgery and improves quality of life for patients. In the hospital, reduced post-operative discomfort enables patients to quickly begin a shorter recovery process. Most patients ambulate more easily and participate more actively in their personal care. Additionally, this approach lowers risk of complications such as bleeding, infection and eliminates the risk of sternal non-union.

Minimally invasive heart surgery improves cosmetic results. Rather than a prominent 10-inch scar down the middle of the chest, patients are left with smaller marks to the side of the ribs. For women, in many cases, this scar is completely unnoticeable as it sits below the breast.

Benefits Include:

- No splitting of the breastbone
- Reduction in pain
- Lower risk of infection
- Lower risk of bleeding
- Reduced ICU and hospital stay
- Improved postoperative pulmonary function
- Accelerated recovery/return to activity
- Improved quality of life
- Greatly improved cosmetic result

== MICS CABG Study Results ==
=== 2014 ===
At the 2014 International Society for Minimally Invasive Cardiothoracic Surgery Annual Meeting in Boston, Dr. Joseph T McGinn presented a study titled "Minimally Invasive CABG is Safe and Reproducible: Report on the First Thousand Cases," which found a low rate of conversion to sternotomy and low rate of complications. Assessing survival and adverse cardiac events up to 8.0 years (average 2.9±2.0 years), MICS CABG is a safe, reproducible operation that yields survival (96.1±0.9%) and durability comparable to conventional CABG.

=== 2013 ===
The Journal of Thoracic and Cardiovascular Surgery published a study on November 1, 2013, that confirmed MICS CABG as safe, feasible, and associated with excellent graft patency rates at 6 months post surgery, with graft patency of 92% for all grafts and 100% for left internal thoracic artery grafts. Coronary artery bypass graft patency was studied through computed tomography angiography. 92% of patients were free from angina and none of the participants experienced any aortic complications, repeat revascularizations, cerebrovascular accidents, myocardial infarctions or death. The two-year study included 91 participants between the ages 48 and 79, averaging a hospital stay of 4 days (range, 3–9 days). Clinical Trial Registration Unique identifier: NCT01334866.

=== 2012 ===
At 2012 American Heart Association's Scientific Sessions and Resuscitation Science Symposium, a study titled "Minimally Invasive CABG: Results to 6 Years" was presented, demonstrating MICS CABG feasibility and established alternative for multivessel sternotomy CABG. It was also noted that the procedure is associated with a short hospital length of stay, no deep wound infections and is safe. The study also proved survival and durability on par with sternotomy.

=== 2010 ===
At the 2010 International Society for Minimally Invasive Cardiothoracic Surgery Annual Meeting in Berlin, Germany, duel center data was presented the standardization of MICS CABG in performance and reproducibility of its results. Its safety and effective alternative for performing surgical myocardial revascularization on the beating heart (OPCAB) is emphasized. "Shortened hospital stay is starting to be realized and its application to high risk and complex patients is now being done."

=== 2009 ===
A 2009 publication in Circulation, titled "Minimally Invasive Coronary Artery Bypass Grafting: Dual-Center Experience in 450 Consecutive Patients" concluded MICS CABG as a feasible procedure with excellent short-term outcomes. At that time the study noted, "this operation could potentially make multivessel MICS CABG safe, effective and more widely available."

== History ==
Minimally invasive cardiac surgery was pioneered by Dr Joseph T McGinn, Jr. The first minimally invasive heart cardiac surgery was performed in the United States on January 21, 2005, at The Heart Institute at Staten Island University Hospital in Staten Island, New York by a team led by Dr. Joseph T. McGinn. This technique is an off-pump coronary artery bypass surgery. The procedure is much less invasive than traditional bypass surgery because it is performed through three small incisions rather than the traditional sternotomy. Since its first procedure, over 1000 MICS CABG procedures have been performed at The Heart Institute and elsewhere around the world. Other centers that utilize the MICS CABG technique for coronary heart disease are the University of Ottawa Heart Center (ON, Canada), Houston Methodist DeBakey Heart Center (Houston, TX), and Vanderbilt University Medical Center (Nashville, TN).
