= MitraClip =

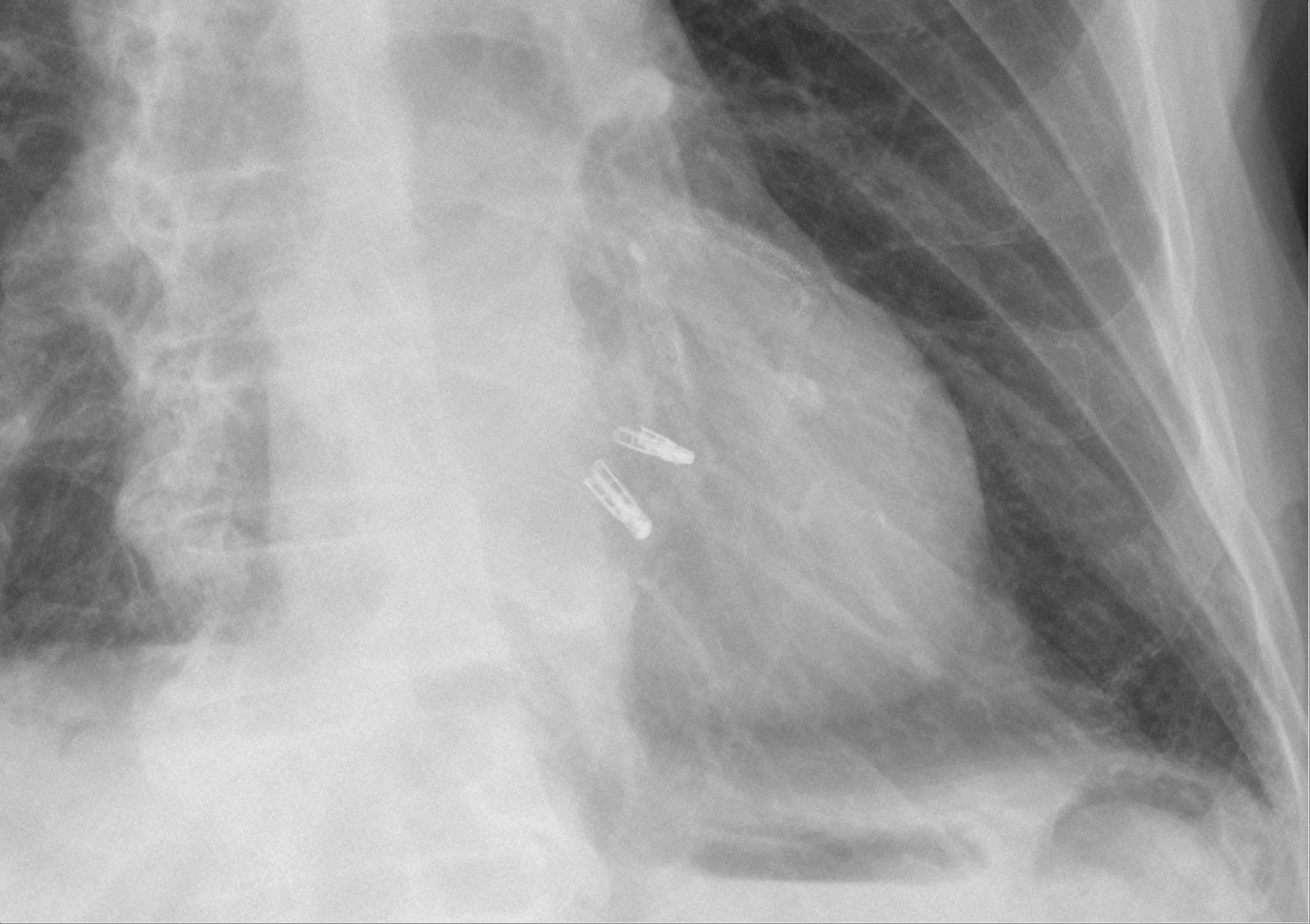
- Chest radiograph showing two MitraClips projecting over the heart.
- Specialty: Cardiology

MitraClip (mitral clip) is a medical device used to treat mitral valve regurgitation for individuals who should not have open-heart surgery. It is implanted via a tri-axial transcatheter technique and involves suturing together the anterior and posterior mitral valve leaflets.

== Medical use and indications ==
MitraClip is used for patients with severe secondary mitral valve regurgitation that is refractory to medical therapy. Primary mitral regurgitation is usually due to an organic cause whereas secondary mitral regurgitation is due to a secondary ischemia or cardiomyopathy. Open-heart surgery remains the preferred treatment option when possible for primary mitral regurgitation, due to the effectiveness and long-term record of the procedure in reducing mitral valve regurgitation. Secondary Mitral regurgitation however can have different options in management as surgery has not been proven in clinical trials to be superior

The indications for using MitraClip are as follows:

1. Those with symptomatic 3+ or 4+ Chronic Moderate-to-severe or severe Mitral Regurgitation are not candidates for surgery
2. New York Heart Association Functional Class III or IV
3. Favorable anatomy: Mitral Valve area greater than 4.0 centimeter squared, Minimal Calcification/no cleft in grasping area, Flail width less than 15mm, flail gap less than 10mm
4. At least 1+ year of life expectancy

== Advantages ==
Compared to patients who need open heart surgery, patients who received mitral clip have less need for a blood transfusion and have fewer ventilation days. When compared to the patient who has had open heart surgery, MitraClip was cheaper - approximately $2200 less per person - and the median stay in the hospital post mitral clip is 2.4 days.

== Contraindications ==
1. Patients who are unable to receive anticoagulation or dual antiplatelet therapy
2. Active mitral valve endocarditis
3. Mitral valve rheumatic disease
4. Patient that has femoral venous, Inferior vena cava (IVC), intracardiac thrombus

== Adverse effects and complications ==
The most common complication of transcatheter mitral valve repair is access site bleeding, although transfusion is generally required less often than with surgical mitral valve repair. Rare but serious complications can include infective endocarditis, mitral stenosis, and device embolization. In general, major adverse events in a 30-day post-procedural time period are significantly lower with a transcatheter versus surgical approach.

In the EVEREST 2 Clinical Trial, new onset atrial fibrillation and acute kidney failure is higher in MitraClip group when compared to the surgical group

== Barriers and disadvantages ==
Major obstacles of mitral clip include the novelty of the technology. As of 2016, there were only 75 centers in the US that were able to offer this technology. Each hospital needs skilled technicians and operators who know 2D and 3D Echo-cardiogram criteria for selecting mitral clip candidates, and who can assist with intraprocedural guidance when the mitral clip is installed.

In addition, as of 2016, there is a lack of coverage of health insurance by Centers of Medicare and Medicaid Services.

According to the EVEREST 2 Trial, 20% of patients who received MitraClip required surgical repair vs 2% who received open heart surgery. Overall surgical repair has more of a pronounced effect in reducing mitral regurgitation

== Post Procedure ==
Patients will need dual anti-platelet therapy for 6 months or more. Within the following 6 months, patients will need antibiotics for endocarditis prophylaxis for dental and urological procedures.

== History ==
In 1996, Ottavio Alfieri proposed to Dr. Mehmet Oz that the mitral valve only needed one suture to close a leak. Oz developed the idea to use a catheter to put one staple in and submitted the patent for MitraClip in 1997. He helped to create a start-up called Evalve Inc. in 1999, which later became a division of Abbott Laboratories. The company's first chief executive officer was Ferolyn Powell. She grew Evalve Inc. until the Abbott acquisition in 2009, and led a trial of 600 patients that revealed those using MitraClip reduced their hospitalizations in half and deaths by 38 percent.

MitraClip was first implanted in 2003, obtained CE marking in Europe in 2008, and approved by the U.S. Food and Drug Administration in 2013. The FDA obligated the company to run post-marketing studies to confirm the safety and efficacy of the device. Two industry-funded RCTs of the MitraClip in patients with mitral regurgitation and heart failure demonstrated mixed results.

Abbott expanded its MitraClip training process in 2016, after several instances of surgical complications.

== See also ==
- Mitral valve repair
- Intrepid Transcatheter Mitral Valve Replacement System
