= Mitral valve repair =

Cardiac surgery procedure

- Anterior (frontal) view of the opened heart. White arrows indicate normal blood flow. (Mitral valve labeled at center right.)
- ICD-9-CM: 35.12

Mitral valve repair is a cardiac surgery procedure performed by cardiac surgeons to treat stenosis (narrowing) or regurgitation (leakage) of the mitral valve. The mitral valve is the "inflow valve" for the left side of the heart. Blood flows from the lungs, where it picks up oxygen, through the pulmonary veins, to the left atrium of the heart. After the left atrium fills with blood, the mitral valve allows blood to flow from the left atrium into the heart's main pumping chamber called the left ventricle. It then closes to keep blood from leaking back into the left atrium or lungs when the ventricle contracts (squeezes) to push blood out to the body. It has two flaps, or leaflets, known as cusps.

The techniques of mitral valve repair include inserting a cloth-covered ring around the valve to bring the leaflets into contact with each other (annuloplasty), removal of redundant/loose segments of the leaflets (quadrangular resection), and re-suspension of the leaflets with artificial (Gore-Tex) cords.

Procedures on the mitral valve usually require a median sternotomy, but advances in non-invasive methods (such as keyhole surgery) allow surgery without a sternotomy (and resulting pain and scar). Minimally invasive mitral valve surgery is much more technically demanding and may involve higher risk.

Occasionally, the mitral valve is abnormal from birth (congenital). More often the mitral valve becomes abnormal with age (degenerative) or as a result of rheumatic fever. In rare instances the mitral valve can be destroyed by infection or a bacterial endocarditis. Mitral regurgitation may also occur as a result of ischemic heart disease (coronary artery disease) or non-ischemic heart disease (dilated cardiomyopathy).

== History ==
In 1923 Dr. Elliott Cutler of the Peter Bent Brigham Hospital performed the world's first successful heart valve surgery – a mitral valve repair. The patient was a 12-year-old comatose girl with rheumatic mitral stenosis.

The development of the heart-lung machine in the 1950s paved the way for replacement of the mitral valve with an artificial valve in the 1960s. For decades after, mitral valve replacement was the only surgical option for patients with a severely diseased mitral valve. However, there are some significant downsides to a prosthetic mitral valve. Infection of the valve can occur, which is dangerous and difficult to treat. Patients with mechanical heart valves are required to take blood thinners for the rest of their lives, which presents a risk of bleeding complications. The artificial mitral valve has an elevated risk of stroke. Patients with mechanical heart valves who use warfarin for anticoagulation have to be on long-term anticoagulation therapy. This means they must go to the clinic and have a lab blood draw done, typically once a month but more frequently if the level needs to be closely monitored until it is in the therapeutic range. The therapeutic range for most adults with a mechanical valve is an INR of 2.5–3.5. Finally, artificial tissue valves will wear out – on average lasting between 10 and 15 years, requiring further surgery at an advanced age.

In the past two decades, some surgeons have embraced surgical techniques to repair the damaged native valve, rather than replace it. These techniques were pioneered by a French heart surgeon, Dr. Alain F. Carpentier. A repair still involves major cardiac surgery but for many patients presents the significant advantage of avoiding blood thinners and may provide a more durable result. However, some studies suggest that blood thinners like Warfarin can reduce a “composite of bleeding and thromboembolic complications” and potentially postoperative complications, as those taking Warfarin have shown “superior long-term survival estimates.” Not all damaged valves are suitable for repair; in some, the state of valve disease is too advanced and replacement is necessary. Often, a surgeon must decide during the operation itself whether a repair or a replacement is the best course of action. For patients with the most common type of mitral valve disease, termed "degenerative" or "myxomatous" mitral valve disease, repair rates are very high and long term durability is excellent.

There has been great debate about timing of surgery in patients with asymptomatic mitral valve regurgitation.

The traditional surgical approach to a mitral valve repair is a full or partial sternotomy, in which the surgeon cuts through the breastbone at the center of the chest to access the heart. There are minimally invasive (port access) options available pioneered by Hugo Vanerman in Belgium. The minimally invasive approach does not involve cutting the breastbone, but instead uses multiple incisions in the side of the chest and the leg. Cardiac surgeons are not unanimous about the relative merits of sternotomy versus the minimally invasive approach. The minimally invasive approach can produce a less prominent scar, is beneficial for very obese patients, and may allow the patient to return to their normal activity sooner than a sternotomy. But some cardiac surgeons argue that unless performed by the most experienced cardiac centers, minimally invasive surgery can involve a longer time on a bypass machine, a lower repair rate, and higher (although still low) risk of stroke. One cardiac surgery professor said, "I think the only benefit is for cosmesis for the patient and the benefit is for marketing and growing our practices for ourselves because it’s a good way to grow one's practice."

Robotic mitral valve repair operations are also being utilized throughout the United States.

In the 2000s there have been several trials of a newer strategy of mitral valve repair that does not require major cardiac surgery. Through a catheter inserted in the groin, the valve leaflets are clipped together. This technique – percutaneous mitral valve repair – is available in Europe but still in clinical trial in the United States. It is a highly specialized technique only available at select hospitals. Early trial results suggest that it may be a beneficial approach for patients who are at high risk from conventional surgery.

As early as January 2000 a team of doctors at the Instituto de Cardiología y Cirugía Cardiovascular in La Habana, Cuba have performed beating heart mitral valve repair or replacement. The beating heart mitral valve replacement technique is as safe as the arrested heart technique, and is the recommended alternative to arrested heart technique.

== See also ==
- Aortic valve repair
- Cardiac surgery
- Mitral valve insufficiency
- MitraClip
