= Bone cutter =

Metal saw designed to shear bone

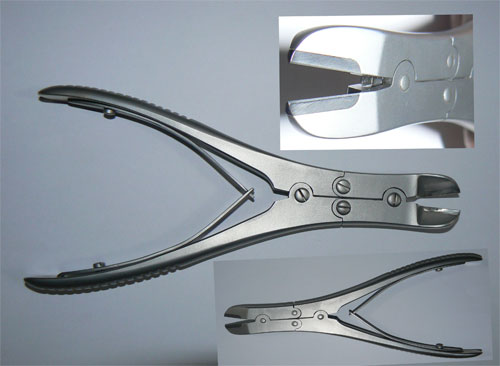
A bone cutter

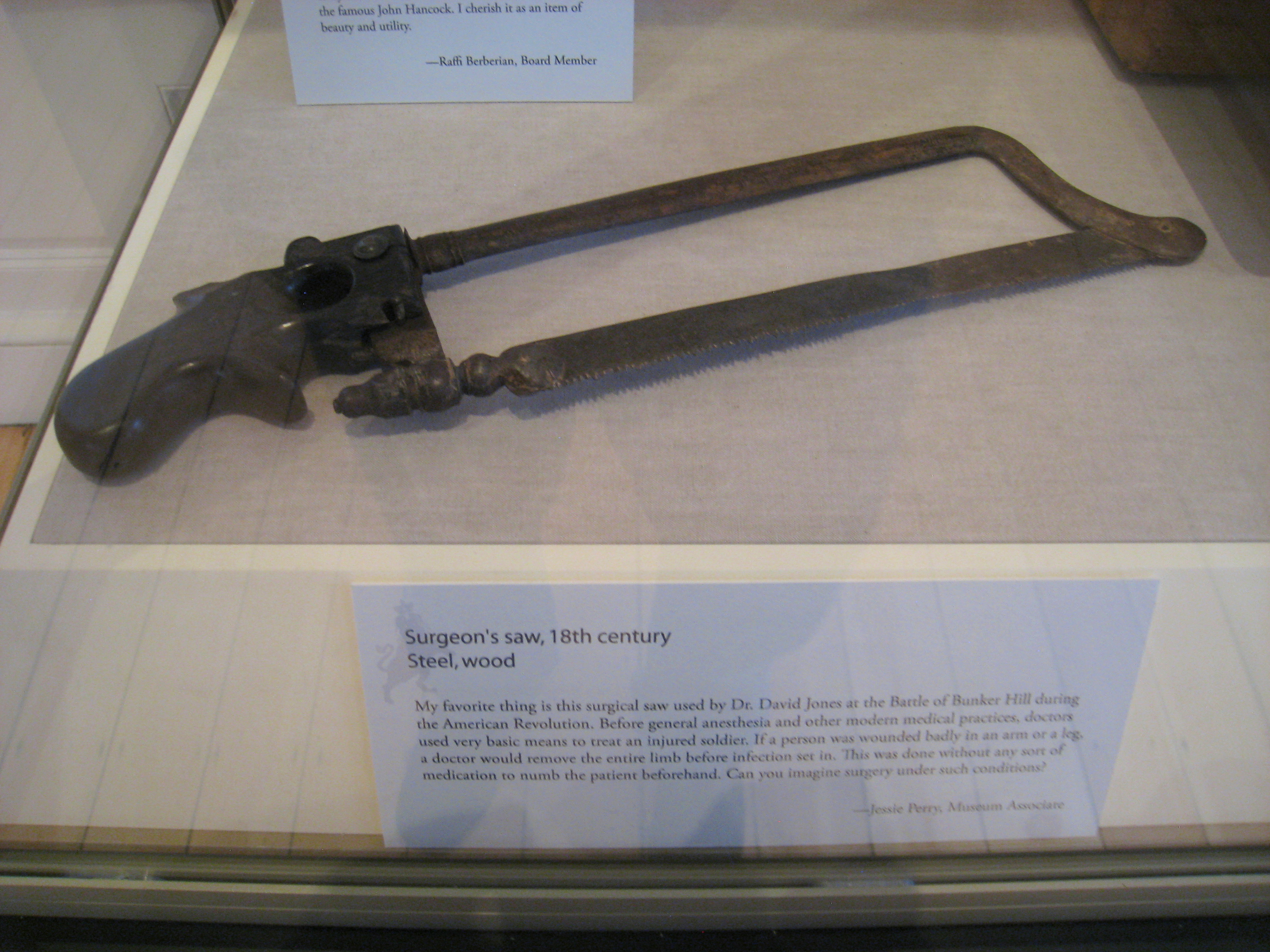
Hacksaw-type surgeon's saw used by Dr. David Jones at the Battle of Bunker Hill

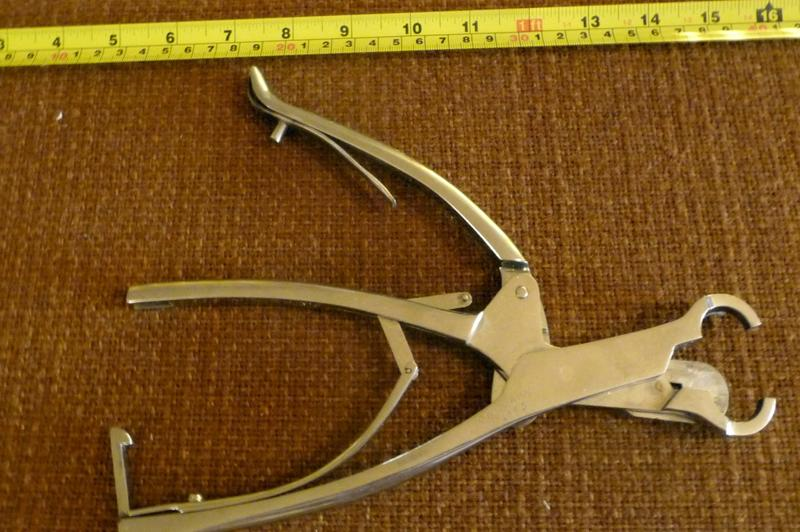
A costotome in the open position

A bone cutter or bone saw is a surgical instrument used to cut or remove bones. In addition to surgery, they are also used in forensics and dismemberment.

Types of medical bone cutters include:

- Unpowered – Unpowered bone cutting implements include varieties of hacksaw. In many applications, the saw is used in specialised jigs to provide accurate, measurable cuts, e.g. in knee surgery. Specialized saws such as the Gigli saw, a cable made of sharp strands of wire, are also used in some procedures.
- Reciprocating – Usually a powered rotary oscillation is applied to a specialised cutting implement to provide smooth controllable cuts into bone, for applications, from skull cutting to rib cutting. A sternal saw is a reciprocating bone cutter.
- Sonic (or sound cutting) – The sonic cutter is still experimental, but its primary focus is to use high frequency, high amplitude sound to remove material (in this case bone), providing the ability to cut. Some tissue sonic cutters are being produced.
- Costotome – A costotome is a specialised rib cutter used to gain access to the thoracic cavity. It has two levers; the first one to be operated grasps the rib, and the second one cuts the rib.

== See also ==
- Instruments used in general surgery
