= Mitral valve replacement =

Procedure to replace mitral valve

- Implantation of a prosthetic heart valve during mitral valve replacement.
- ICD-9-CM: 35.23-35.24

Mitral valve replacement is a procedure whereby the diseased mitral valve of a patient's heart is replaced by either a mechanical or tissue (bioprosthetic) valve.

The mitral valve may need to be replaced because:

- The valve is leaky (mitral valve regurgitation)
- The valve is narrowed and doesn't open properly (mitral valve stenosis)

Causes of mitral valve disease include infection, calcification and inherited collagen disease. Current mitral valve replacement approaches include open heart surgery and minimally invasive cardiac surgery (MICS).

== Normal mitral valve anatomy and physiology ==
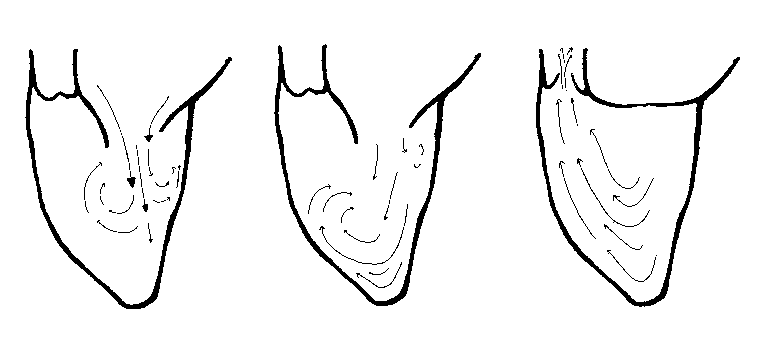
From left to right: Fluid jetting from the left atrium through the mitral valve into the left ventricle, fluid creating a vortex near the apex in the left ventricle, and fluid being redirected out of the left ventricle through the aortic valve.

The mitral valve is a bileaflet valve sited between the left atrium and left ventricle, responsible for preventing blood flowing from the ventricle to the atrium when the heart contracts. It is elliptical, and its area varies from 5.0 to 11.4 cm^{2}. The valve leaflets are separated by two commissures, and each leaflet of the valve (anterior leaflet, the large one, and posterior leaflet, the small one) has three sections (p1, p2, p3). Histologically, each leaflet is composed of the solid fibrosa, the spongiosa at the atrial surface and another fibroelastic layer covering the leaflets. Two papillary muscles originating from the base of the left ventricle hold the mitral leaflets in place through chordae tendinae, which insert the edge of the leaflets, preventing them from leaking during left ventricle systole.

=== Vortex formation ===
During normal mitral valve function fluid jets from the left atrium through the mitral valve into the left ventricle. The vortex created from this jetting travels towards the apex of the left ventricle because of the asymmetric shape of the mitral valve leaflets. This vortex rotates clockwise until the isovolumetric contraction of the left ventricle opens the aortic valve and redirects the fluid flow from the apex of the left ventricle to the systemic circulation and the rest of the body.

The asymmetry of the mitral valve is very important in the diastolic flow patterns of transmitral flow. Additionally the entire systems; the mitral annulus, papillary muscles and the chordae tendinea all play a vital role in forming a sophisticated vortex that optimizes the fluid flow in the left heart. Simulations have been performed showing how all of these aspects of the mitral valve contribute to the normal vortex formation in the left heart.

== Mitral stenosis and regurgitation ==
The most common cause of mitral stenosis is rheumatic fever, seen mostly in the developing world. Other causes are mitral degenerative disease, severe calcification (elderly), congenital deformities, malignant carcinoid syndrome, neoplasm, left atrial appendage thrombus, endocarditic vegetations, certain inherited metabolic diseases, or complications of previous procedures at the aortic valve. Mitral stenosis causes left atrial pressure to increase, which, if left untreated, can lead to ventricular dilation, hypertrophy, atrial fibrillation, and thrombus creation. Symptoms include shortness of breath (dyspnea) on exertion, when lying flat (orthopnea) or during the night (paroxysmal nocturnal dyspnea), and fatigue.

If mitral leaflets don't coapt (close) effectively, blood flows backwards (regurgitation) from the left ventricle towards the left atrium during systole. The most common causes are myxomatous degeneration (Barlow disease), ischemic heart disease, dilated cardiomyopathy, rheumatic valve disease, mitral annular calcification, infective endocarditis, congenital anomalies, endocardial fibrosis, myocarditis, and collagen-vascular disorders. The most used system to classify mitral valve regurgitation is Carpentier's classification, which separates mitral regurgitation into three types, depending on the leaflet motion in relation to the mitral annular plane:

- Type I: the leaflets are moving normally
- Type II: leaflet motion is excessive
- Type III: leaflet movement is restricted.

== Artificial valve types ==
There are two main types of artificial mitral valve: mechanical valves and tissue (bioprosthetic) valves. They come in various sizes (commonly starting from an external diameter of 19 mm and increasing by 2 mm per model).

=== Mechanical valves ===
Mechanical valves are made from metal and/or pyrolitic carbon, and can last 20–30 years. The risk of blood clots forming is higher with mechanical valves than with bioprosthetic valves. As a result, patients with mechanical valves must take blood-thinning medication (anticoagulants) for the rest of their lives, making them more prone to bleeding.

There are three types of mechanical valves:

1. Caged ball valve (not in use any more)
2. Tilting disc
3. Bileaflet disc

Bileaflet valves are the most common type of mechanical valve, offering desirable haemodynamics. The two leaflets of a bileaflet disc valve open during diastole and close during systole.

=== Bioprosthetic valves ===
Bioprosthetic valves are made from animal tissues. Most people with bioprosthetic valves don't need to take anticoagulants long term. However, bioprosthetic valves may only last 10–15 years. They tend to deteriorate more quickly in younger patients. Valve failure prevalence at 10 years is 30%, increasing to 35–65% at 15 years. New tissue preservation technologies are being studied to try to increase the durability of bioprosthetic valves.

=== Valve selection ===
The choice of valve depends upon the patient's age, medical condition, preferences, and lifestyle. Typically, patients younger than 65 years old will receive a mechanical valve unless they are unable to take long-term anticoagulation, and patients older than 70 years will receive a bioprosthetic valve.

== Procedure ==
The most common approach for surgeons to reach the heart is a median sternotomy (vertically cutting the breastbone), but other incisions can be employed, such as a left or right thoracotomy. After the heart is exposed, the patient is put on a cardiopulmonary bypass machine, also known as a heart–lung machine. This machine breathes for the patient and pumps their blood around their body – bypassing the heart – while the surgeon replaces the heart valve. Next, an aortic clamp is placed on the aorta, and the heart is stopped (cardioplegia). Depending on the pathology of the mitral valve and surgeon's preference, various approaches can be used to access the mitral valve. The interatrial groove approach involves incising the left atrium posterior to the interatrial groove. The transatrial oblique approach is utilized when the left atrium is small. In this approach, the right atrium is opened and another incision is made at the interatrial septum.

The valve is excised 4–5 mm from the annulus, leaving intact the attached chordae unless they are calcified or otherwise diseased. The valve is replaced by a mechanical or bioprosthetic valve. The replacement valve is sewn into the annulus with interrupted or horizontal mattress sutures with the pledgets on the atrial side. The atrial walls are closed, taking care not to trap air within the chambers of the heart. The heart is restarted, and the patient is taken off the heart–lung machine.

== Recovery ==
Following surgery, patients are typically taken to an intensive care unit for monitoring. They may need a respirator to help them breathe for the first few hours or days after surgery. The patient should be able to sit up in bed within 24 hours. After two days, the patient may be moved out of the intensive care unit. Patients are usually discharged after 7–10 days. If the mitral valve replacement is successful, patients can expect their symptoms to improve significantly.

Some scarring occurs after surgery. After median sternotomy, the patient will have a vertical scar on their chest above their breastbone. If the heart is accessed from under the left breast there will be a smaller scar in this location.

Patients with a bioprosthetic mitral valve are prescribed anticoagulants, such as warfarin, for 6 weeks to 3 months after their operation, while patients with mechanical valves are prescribed anticoagulants for the rest of their lives. Anticoagulants are taken to prevent blood clots, which can move to other parts of the body and cause serious medical problems, such as a heart attack. Anticoagulants will not dissolve a blood clot but they do prevent other clots from forming or prevent clots from becoming larger.

Once their wounds have healed, patients should have few, if any, restrictions from daily activities. People are advised to walk or undertake other physical activities gradually to regain strength. Patients who have physically demanding jobs will have to wait a little longer than those who don't. Patients are also restricted from driving a car for six weeks after the surgery.

== Complications ==
As with other cardiac procedures, mitral valve replacement is associated with risks, such as bleeding, infection, thromboembolism, renal shutdown, cardiac tamponade, stroke, or reaction to anesthesia. The risk of death is about 1%. Risks depend on a patient's age, general health, specific medical conditions, and heart function.

=== Flipped vortex circulation ===
Pedrizetti et al. studied the fluid mechanics in the left heart in 40 randomized patients with mechanical and tissue artificial heart valves. Using echocardiography they quantitatively analyzed the velocity field in the left heart and found that the patients with artificial mitral valves had a consistent counterclockwise circulation, as opposed to the normal clockwise circulation that is characteristic of normal transmitral flow.

To further characterize this counterclockwise circulation a numerical simulation was performed which backed up the data taken from the echocardiograph study.

This flipped vortex circulation could lead to further complications in the patient who had mitral valve replacement surgery as it was observed to cause stagnation points, crossed flows, increased energy requirements and pressure shifts from the lateral to the septal wall in the left heart.

== Minimally invasive mitral valve replacement ==
Since the 1990s, surgeons have been working on less invasive approaches to mitral valve surgery, known as minimally invasive cardiac surgery (MICS). Minimally invasive mitral valve replacement involves a small incision (5–8 cm) just below the right breast. The benefits of MICS over conventional surgery include reduced hospital stay and blood transfusion requirements, and a smaller scar.

== Transcatheter mitral valve replacement ==
Rather than removing the existing valve, transcatheter mitral valve replacement involves wedging a new valve into the site of the existing valve. The replacement valve is delivered to the site of the existing valve through a tube called a catheter. The catheter may be inserted through the femoral artery in the thigh, or through a small incision in the chest. Once the replacement valve is in place, it is expanded, pushing the old valve's leaflets (the sections that open and close) out of the way.

== Alternatives to mitral valve replacement ==
=== Repair ===
Many mitral valves can be repaired instead of replaced. In fact, mitral valve repair is recommended by international guidelines wherever possible. Advantages of mitral valve repair over replacement include lower surgical mortality (~1% for repair vs ~5% for replacement), lower rates of stroke and endocarditis (an infection of the heart's inner lining), equivalent or better long‑term durability, and improved long-term survival. Patients who have their valve repaired have a similar life expectancy to the general population. In addition, patients may not need to take anticoagulants long term following mitral valve repair.

=== Non-surgical options ===
For individuals with few symptoms, or those with contraindications to surgery, options exist for medical treatment in both mitral insufficiency and mitral valve stenosis, although they won't cure the conditions. Such medical treatments include diuretics, vasodilators, and ACE inhibitors.

== See also ==
- Mitral regurgitation
- Mitral stenosis
- Artificial heart valve
- Cardiac surgery
- Heart-lung machine

== Sources ==
- Fann, James I.; Ingels, Neil B.; Miller, D. Craig (2017). "Pathophysiology of Mitral Valve Disease". In Cohn, Lawrence H.; Adams, David H. (eds.). Cardiac Surgery in the Adult (5th ed.). McGraw-Hill Education. ISBN 978-0-07-184487-1.
- Khonsari, Siavosh; Sintek, Colleen Flint (2003). Cardiac Surgery, Safeguards and Pitfalls in Operative Techniques (3rd ed.). Lippincott Williams & Wilkins. ISBN 978-0-7817-3540-7.
- Kouchoukos, Nicholas; Blackstone, Eugene; Hanley, Frank; Kirklin, James K. (2013). Cardiac Surgery. Elsevier Health Sciences. ISBN 978-1-4160-6391-9.
