= Left ventricular thrombus =

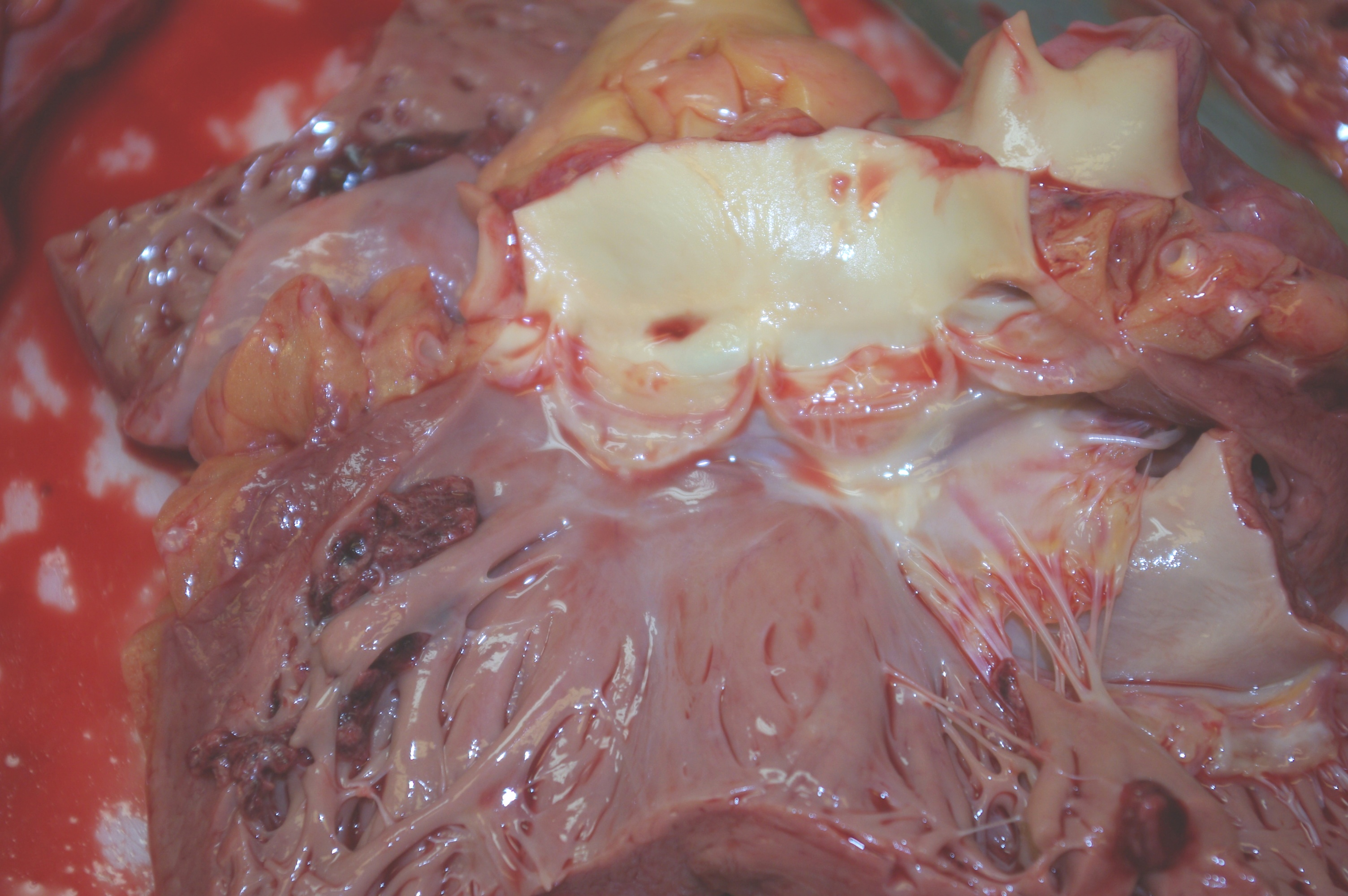
- Blood clots in the ventricle found on autopsy

Left ventricular thrombus is a blood clot (thrombus) in the left ventricle of the heart. LVT is a common complication of acute myocardial infarction (AMI). Typically the clot is a mural thrombus, meaning it is on the wall of the ventricle. The primary risk of LVT is the occurrence of cardiac embolism, in which the thrombus detaches from the ventricular wall and travels through the circulation and blocks blood vessels. Blockage can be especially damaging in the heart or brain (stroke).

== Pathophysiology ==
LVT occurs most often during the first 2 weeks following AMI. AMI patients most at risk display the 3 characteristics of Virchow's triad:

=== Stagnation of blood ===
The risk of LVT formation increases as infarction size increases. A larger infarction means a larger area of tissue injury, which may be akinetic or dyskinetic, resulting in stagnation of ventricular blood.

=== Endothelial injury ===
Monocytes and macrophages play important roles in healing after myocardial infarction. With the absence of monocytes and macrophages, chances of LVT formation are very high. Failure to clear cellular debris from the infarct compromises the endothelial lining of the left ventricle and exposes the damaged tissue to the blood. The response is to build a thrombus composed of fibrin, red blood cells and platelets.

=== Hypercoagulable state ===
For several days after AMI, the levels of tissue factor and D-dimer, which are involved in coagulation, are high, which increases the risk of LVT formation. LVT may be good for the heart when tissues are severely damaged because it acts to thicken the wall, thus protecting it against rupture.

== Diagnosis ==
Echocardiography is the main diagnostic tool for LVT. A distinct mass is visible in the left ventricle. Computed Tomography and Magnetic Resonance Imaging are effective, but less common ways to detect LVT, due to their costs and risks. It is possible to assess whether a thrombus will become an embolus through echocardiography. Mobility and protrusion of the thrombus are two characteristics associated with increased embolic potential.

Thrombus of the left ventricle resulting in embolism of the spleen

Thrombus of the left ventricle resulting in embolism of the spleen

Thrombus of the left ventricle resulting in embolism of the spleen

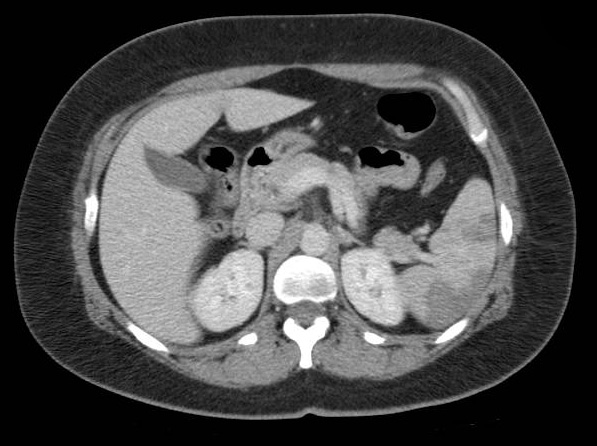
Thrombus of the left ventricle resulting in embolism of the spleen

== Prevention ==
After an AMI, people should be treated to prevent LVT formation. Aspirin plus an oral anticoagulant such as warfarin are suggested for individuals at risk for thromboembolic events. Anticoagulants are also shown to reduce the risk of embolisms when a thrombus is already formed. Heparin, an injectable, fast-acting anticoagulant, is effective in high doses for preventing LVT formation after AMI.

== Treatment ==
Systemic anticoagulation is considered first-line medical therapy for LVT, as it reduces the risk of systemic embolism. There are also surgical procedures for removal of a thrombus (thrombectomy).

== Epidemiology ==
The rate of LVT formation after AMI is thought to be declining due to the use of better therapies and percutaneous coronary intervention used to treat myocardial infarction. In the modern era LVT formation after ST elevation MI treated with percutaneous coronary intervention is low, estimated at only 2.7%. However, incidence of LVT is considered higher in anterior wall AMI, compared with other types.
