= Median sternotomy =

Surgical access through vertical sternum incision

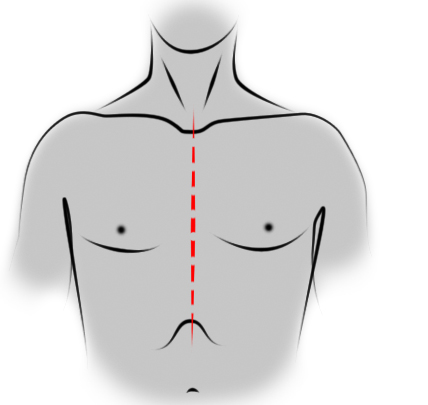
- Skin incision of a median sternotomy
- [edit on Wikidata]

Median sternotomy is a type of surgical procedure in which a vertical inline incision is made along the sternum, after which the sternum itself is divided using a sternal saw. This procedure provides access to the heart and lungs for surgical procedures such as heart transplant, lung transplant, corrective surgery for congenital heart defects, or coronary artery bypass surgery.

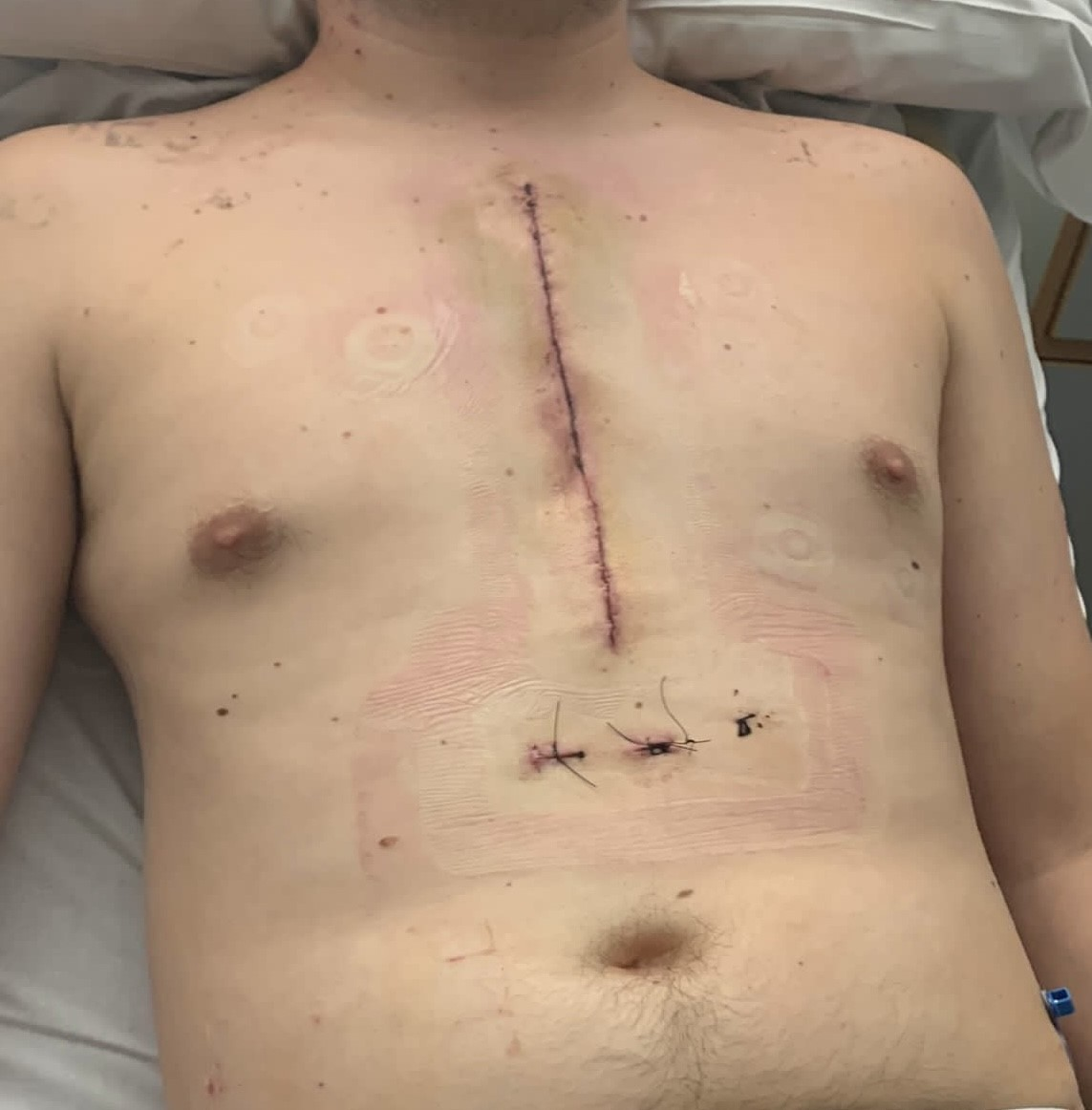
Example of a median sternotomy on a young adult male, around 72 hours following the procedure

The median sternotomy was first proposed by Herbert M. N. Milton in 1897. Since the first successful open heart operation in 1953, most cardiac surgeons initially used the bilateral anterior thoracotomy, which was a very complication-prone and painful approach. In 1957, after the demonstration of the superiority of median sternotomy, it became the standard incision and has remained so until today. Through this approach, the surgeon can see the entire heart and control the whole operative field visually and tactically. Cardiac surgery through sternotomy is safe and efficient, and is considered to be the gold standard for surgical treatment of all congenital and acquired heart diseases resulting in low failure rates and excellent proven long-term outcomes.

Cardiac surgery via median sternotomy is performed in over 1 million patients per year worldwide.
