= Mitral regurgitation =

Form of valvular heart disease

- Other names: Mitral incompetence, mitral insufficiency
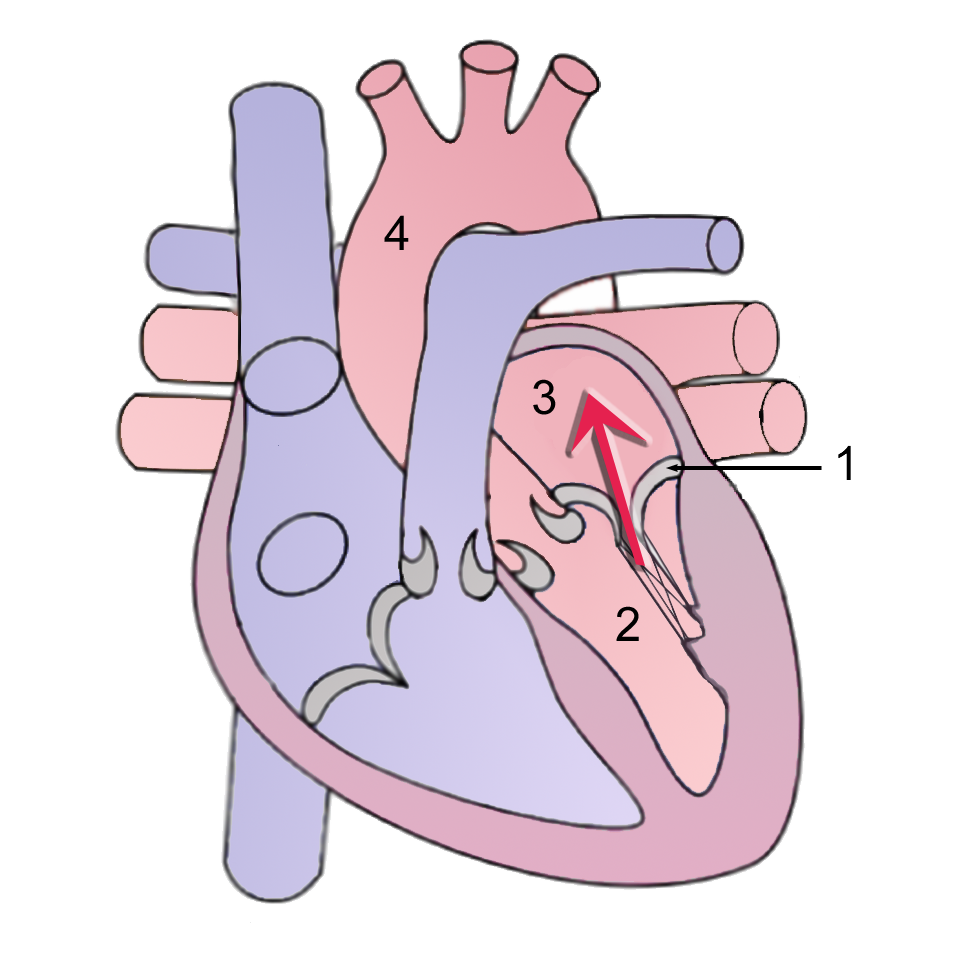
- Mitral regurgitation (schematic drawing); During systole, contraction of the left ventricle causes abnormal backflow (arrow) into the left atrium. 1 Mitral valve 2 Left ventricle 3 Left atrium 4 Aorta
- Specialty: Cardiology
- Symptoms: Heart murmur, shortness of breath during exercise or lying down, fatigue, pulmonary infiltrate, palpitations, swollen feet or ankles
- Complications: In severe cases: congestive heart failure, arrhythmias (atrial fibrillation), pulmonary hypertension
- Types: Acute mitral regurgitation, chronic compensated mitral regurgitation, chronic decompensated mitral regurgitation
- Causes: Mitral valve prolapse, ageing, rheumatic fever, mitral annular calcification, infective endocarditis, hypertrophic cardiomyopathy
- Treatment: Medication, mitral valve repair, mitral valve replacement, MitraClip

Mitral valve prolapse murmur at mitral area
Heart sounds of a 16-year-old girl diagnosed with mitral valve prolapse and mitral regurgitation. Auscultating her heart, a systolic murmur and click are heard. Recorded with the stethoscope over the mitral valve.

Mitral valve prolapse murmur at tricuspid area
Her heart sounds while she holds her breath. Recorded with the stethoscope over the tricuspid valve.

Mitral valve prolapse murmur at tricuspid area after exercising
Her heart sounds during recovery after running. Recorded with the stethoscope over the tricuspid valve.

Mitral regurgitation (MR), also known as mitral insufficiency or mitral incompetence, is a form of valvular heart disease in which the mitral valve is insufficient and does not close properly when the heart pumps out blood. It is the abnormal leaking of blood backwards – regurgitation from the left ventricle, through the mitral valve, into the left atrium, when the left ventricle contracts. Mitral regurgitation is the most common form of valvular heart disease.

== Definition ==
Mitral regurgitation, also known as mitral insufficiency or mitral incompetence, is the backward flow of blood from the left ventricle, through the mitral valve, and into the left atrium, when the left ventricle contracts, resulting in a systolic murmur radiating to the left armpit.

== Signs and symptoms ==
Phonocardiograms from normal and abnormal heart sounds

Mitral regurgitation may be present for many years before any symptoms appear. The symptoms associated with MR are dependent on which phase of the disease process the individual is in. Individuals with acute MR are typically severely symptomatic and will have the signs and symptoms of acute decompensated congestive heart failure (i.e. shortness of breath, pulmonary edema, orthopnea, and paroxysmal nocturnal dyspnea). In acute cases, a murmur and tachycardia may be the only distinctive signs.

Individuals with chronic compensated MR may be asymptomatic for long periods of time, with a normal exercise tolerance and no evidence of heart failure. Over time, however, there may be decompensation and patients can develop volume overload (congestive heart failure). Symptoms of entry into a decompensated phase may include fatigue, shortness of breath particularly on exertion, and leg swelling. Also, there may be development of an irregular heart rhythm known as atrial fibrillation.

Findings on clinical examination depend on the severity and duration of MR. The mitral component of the first heart sound is usually soft and with a laterally displaced apex beat, often with heave. The first heart sound is followed by a high-pitched holosystolic murmur at the apex, radiating to the back or clavicular area. Its duration is, as the name suggests, the whole of systole. The loudness of the murmur does not correlate well with the severity of regurgitation. It may be followed by a loud, palpable P_{2}, heard best when lying on the left side. A third heart sound is commonly heard.

Patients with mitral valve prolapse may have a holosystolic murmur or often a mid-to-late systolic click and a late systolic murmur. Cases with a late systolic regurgitant murmur may still be associated with significant hemodynamic consequences.

Mitral regurgitation as a result of papillary muscle damage or rupture may be a complication of a heart attack and lead to cardiogenic shock.

== Cause ==
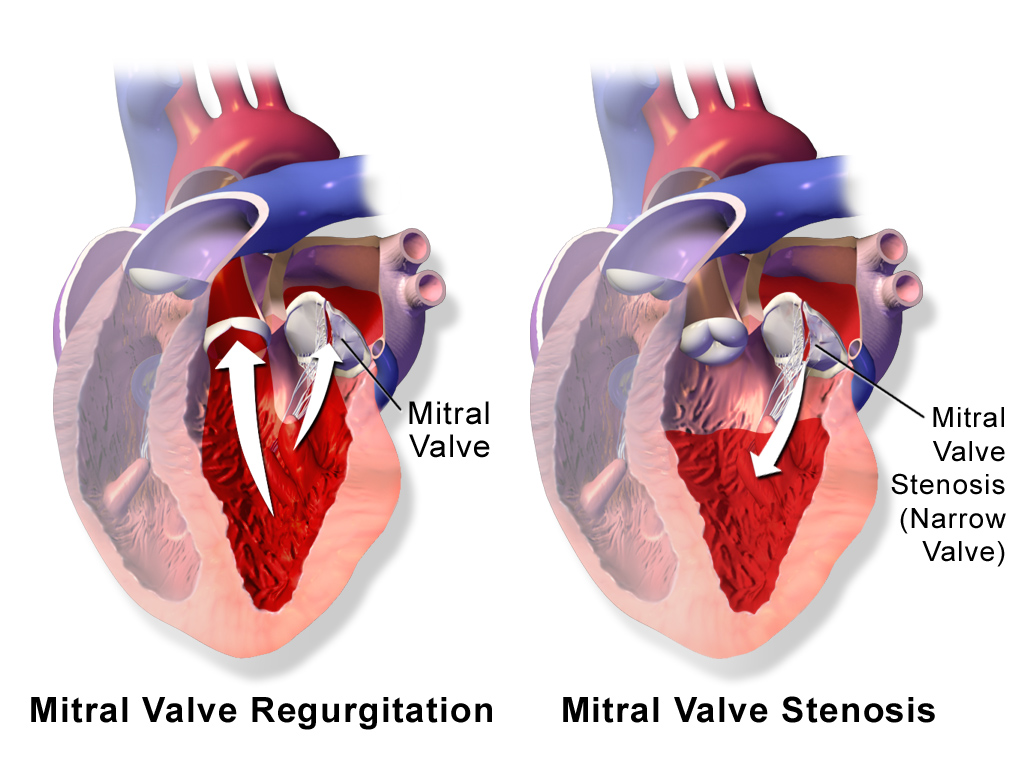
Illustration comparing mitral valve regurgitation to mitral valve stenosis

The mitral valve apparatus comprises two valve leaflets, the mitral annulus, which forms a ring around the valve leaflets, and the papillary muscles, which tether the valve leaflets to the left ventricle and prevent them from prolapsing into the left atrium. The chordae tendineae are also present and connect the valve leaflets to the papillary muscles. Dysfunction of any of these portions of the mitral valve apparatus can cause regurgitation.

The most common cause of MR in developed countries is mitral valve prolapse. It is the most common cause of primary mitral regurgitation in the United States, causing about 50% of cases. Myxomatous degeneration of the mitral valve is more common in women as well as with advancing age, which causes a stretching of the leaflets of the valve and the chordae tendineae. Such elongation prevents the valve leaflets from fully coming together when the valve closes, causing the valve leaflets to prolapse into the left atrium, thereby causing MR.

Ischemic heart disease causes MR by the combination of ischemic dysfunction of the papillary muscles, and the dilatation of the left ventricle. This can lead to the subsequent displacement of the papillary muscles and the dilatation of the mitral valve annulus.

Rheumatic fever (RF), Marfan's syndrome and the Ehlers–Danlos syndromes are other typical causes. Mitral valve stenosis (MVS) can sometimes be a cause of MR in the sense that a stenotic valve (calcified and with restricted range of movement) allows backflow (regurgitation) if it is too stiff and misshapen to close completely. Most MVS is caused by RF, so one can say that MVS is sometimes the proximal cause of MI/MR (that is, stenotic MI/MR) and that RF is often the distal cause of MVS, MI/MR, or both. MR and mitral valve prolapse are also common in Ehlers–Danlos syndromes.

Secondary mitral regurgitation is due to the dilatation of the left ventricle that causes stretching of the mitral valve annulus and displacement of the papillary muscles. This dilatation of the left ventricle can be due to any cause of dilated cardiomyopathy including aortic insufficiency, nonischemic dilated cardiomyopathy, and noncompaction cardiomyopathy. Because the papillary muscles, chordae, and valve leaflets are usually normal in such conditions, it is also called functional mitral regurgitation.Acute MR is most often caused by endocarditis, mainly S. aureus. Rupture or dysfunction of the papillary muscle are also common causes in acute cases, dysfunction, which can include mitral valve prolapse.

== Pathophysiology ==
The pathophysiology of MR can be broken into three phases of the disease process: the acute phase, the chronic compensated phase, and the chronic decompensated phase.

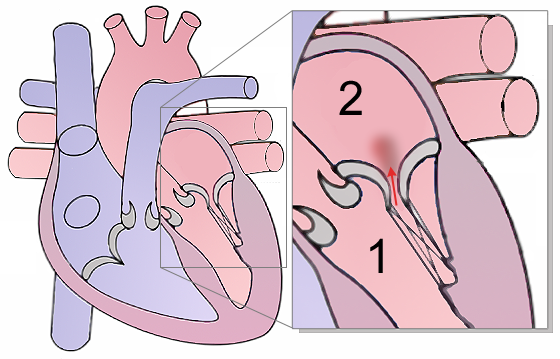
Mild mitral regurgitation. The colored cloud symbolizes the return blood flow. 1. left ventricle, 2. left atrium

=== Acute phase ===
Acute MR (as may occur due to the sudden rupture of the chordae tendinae or papillary muscle) causes a sudden volume overload of both the left atrium and the left ventricle. The left ventricle develops volume overload because with every contraction it now has to pump out not only the volume of blood that goes into the aorta (the forward cardiac output or forward stroke volume) but also the blood that regurgitates into the left atrium (the regurgitant volume). The combination of the forward stroke volume and the regurgitant volume is known as the total stroke volume of the left ventricle. In the acute setting, the stroke volume of the left ventricle is increased (increased ejection fraction); this happens because of more complete emptying of the heart. However, as it progresses the LV volume increases and the contractile function deteriorates, thus leading to dysfunctional LV and a decrease in ejection fraction. The increase in stroke volume is explained by the Frank–Starling mechanism, in which increased ventricular pre-load stretches the myocardium such that contractions are more forceful.

The regurgitant volume causes a volume overload and a pressure overload of the left atrium and the left ventricle. The increased pressures in the left side of the heart may inhibit drainage of blood from the lungs via the pulmonary veins and lead to pulmonary congestion.

=== Chronic phase ===
==== Compensated ====
If the MR develops slowly over months to years or if the acute phase cannot be managed with medical therapy, the individual will enter the chronic compensated phase of the disease. In this phase, the left ventricle develops eccentric hypertrophy in order to better manage the larger than normal stroke volume. The eccentric hypertrophy and the increased diastolic volume combine to increase the stroke volume (to levels well above normal) so that the forward stroke volume (forward cardiac output) approaches the normal levels. In the left atrium, the volume overload causes enlargement of the left atrium, allowing the filling pressure in the left atrium to decrease. This improves the drainage from the pulmonary veins, and signs and symptoms of pulmonary congestion will decrease.

These changes in the left ventricle and left atrium improve the low forward cardiac output state and the pulmonary congestion that occur in the acute phase of the disease. Individuals in the chronic compensated phase may be asymptomatic and have normal exercise tolerances.

==== Decompensated ====
An individual may be in the compensated phase of MR for years, but will eventually develop left ventricular dysfunction, the hallmark for the chronic decompensated phase of MR. It is currently unclear what causes an individual to enter the decompensated phase of this disease. However, the decompensated phase is characterized by calcium overload within the cardiac myocytes.

In this phase, the ventricular myocardium is no longer able to contract adequately to compensate for the volume overload of mitral regurgitation, and the stroke volume of the left ventricle will decrease. The decreased stroke volume causes a decreased forward cardiac output and an increase in the end-systolic volume. The increased end-systolic volume translates to increased filling pressures of the left ventricle and increased pulmonary venous congestion. The individual may again have symptoms of congestive heart failure.The left ventricle begins to dilate during this phase. This causes a dilatation of the mitral valve annulus, which may worsen the degree of MR. The dilated left ventricle causes an increase in the wall stress of the cardiac chamber as well. While the ejection fraction is less in the chronic decompensated phase than in the acute phase or the chronic compensated phase, it may still be in the normal range (i.e.: > 50 percent), and may not decrease until late in the disease course. A decreased ejection fraction in an individual with MR and no other cardiac abnormality should alert the physician that the disease may be in its decompensated phase.

== Diagnosis ==
There are many diagnostic tests that have abnormal results in the presence of MR. These tests suggest the diagnosis of MR and may indicate to the physician that further testing is warranted. For instance, the electrocardiogram (ECG) in long-standing MR may show evidence of left atrial enlargement and left ventricular dilatation. Atrial fibrillation may also be noted on the ECG in individuals with chronic mitral regurgitation. The ECG may not show any of these findings in the setting of acute MR.

Comparison of acute and chronic phases of MR
	Acute	Chronic
Electrocardiogram	Normal	P mitrale, Atrial fibrillation, left ventricular hypertrophy
Heart size	Normal	Cardiomegaly, left atrial enlargement
Systolic murmur	Heard at the base, radiates to the neck, spine, or top of head	Heard at the apex, radiates to the axilla
Apical thrill	May be absent	Present
Jugular venous distension	Present	Absent

The quantification of MR usually employs imaging studies such as echocardiography or magnetic resonance angiography of the heart.

=== Chest X-ray ===
The chest X-ray in individuals with chronic MR is characterized by enlargement of the left atrium and the left ventricle, and then maybe calcification of the mitral valve.

=== Echocardiogram ===
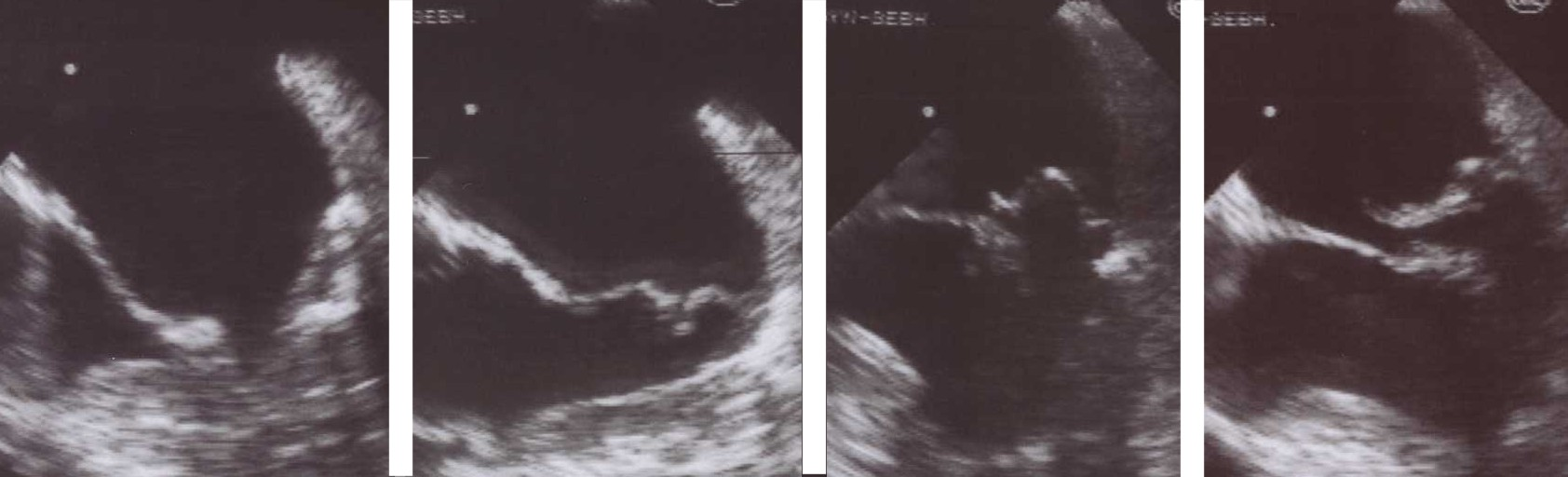
Transesophageal echocardiogram of mitral valve prolapse

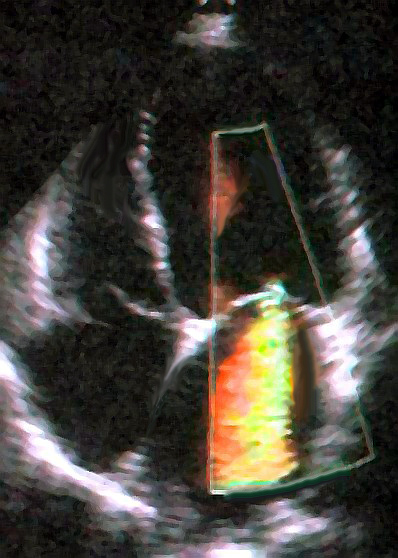
Echocardiogram of severe mitral regurgitation

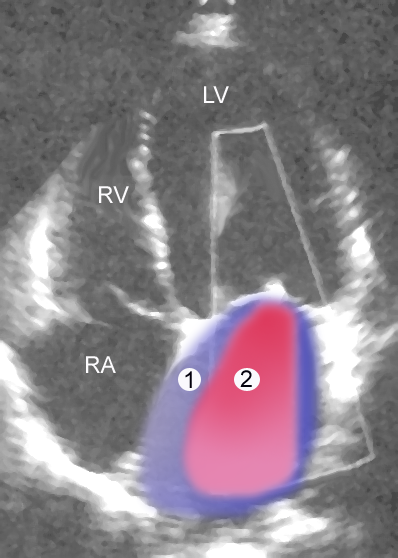
Legend: (1) Left atrium; (2) MR Jet; (LV) Left ventricle; (RV) Right ventricle; (RA) Right atrium

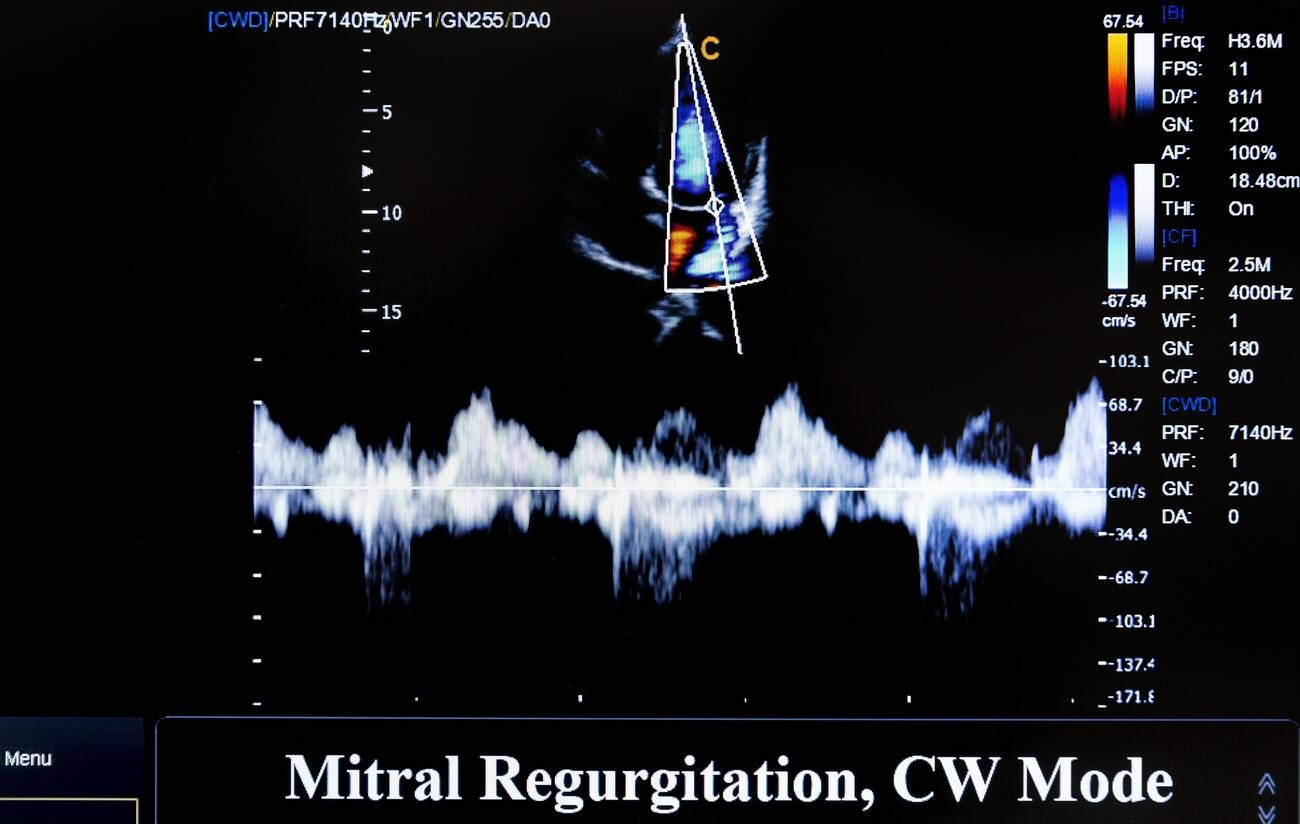
Continuous Wave (CW) Doppler echocardiogram of a human patient tracking high-velocity mitral regurgitation. The display features an apical 2D color flow layout (top) cross-referenced with a spectral Doppler waveform (bottom) used to calculate the regurgitant flow velocity.

An echocardiogram is commonly used to confirm the diagnosis of MR. Color doppler flow on the transthoracic echocardiogram (TTE) will reveal a jet of blood flowing from the left ventricle into the left atrium during ventricular systole. Also, it may detect a dilated left atrium and ventricle and decreased left ventricular function. A transesophageal echocardiogram can give clearer images if needed as the back of the heart can also be viewed.

=== Electrocardiography ===
P mitrale is a broad, bifid notched P wave in several or many leads with a prominent late negative component to the P wave in lead V_{1}, and may be seen in MR, but also in mitral stenosis, and, potentially, any cause of overload of the left atrium.

=== Quantification of mitral regurgitation ===
The degree of severity of MR can be quantified by the regurgitant fraction, which is the percentage of the left ventricular stroke volume that regurgitates into the left atrium.

regurgitant fraction = $\frac{V_{mitral} - V_{aortic}} {V_{mitral}} \times 100\%$

where V_{mitral} and V_{aortic} are, respectively, the volumes of blood that flow forward through the mitral valve and aortic valve during a cardiac cycle. Methods that have been used to assess the regurgitant fraction in mitral regurgitation include echocardiography, cardiac catheterization, fast CT scan, and cardiac MRI. The echocardiographic technique to measure the regurgitant fraction is to determine the forward flow through the mitral valve (from the left atrium to the left ventricle) during ventricular diastole, and comparing it with the flow out of the left ventricle through the aortic valve in ventricular systole. This method assumes that the aortic valve does not have aortic insufficiency. Another way to quantify the degree of MR is to determine the area of the regurgitant flow at the level of the valve. This is known as the regurgitant orifice area and correlates with the size of the defect in the mitral valve. One particular echocardiographic technique used to measure the orifice area is measurement of the proximal isovelocity surface area (PISA). The flaw of using PISA to determine the mitral valve regurgitant orifice area is that it measures the flow at one moment in time in the cardiac cycle, which may not reflect the average performance of the regurgitant jet.

PISA method for quantification of mitral regurgitation

Determination of the degree of mitral regurgitation
Grade	Degree of mitral regurgitation	Regurgitant fraction	Regurgitant Orifice area
1	Mild	< 20 percent	
2	Moderate	20–40 percent	
3	Moderate to severe	40–60 percent	
4	Severe	> 60 percent	> 0.4 cm^{2}

== Treatment ==
The treatment of MR depends on the acuteness of the disease and whether there are associated signs of hemodynamic compromise. In general, medical therapy is non-curative and is used for mild-to-moderate regurgitation or in patients unable to tolerate surgery.

In acute MR secondary to a mechanical defect in the heart (i.e., rupture of a papillary muscle or chordae tendineae), the treatment of choice is mitral valve surgery. If the patient is hypotensive prior to the surgical procedure, an intra-aortic balloon pump may be placed in order to improve perfusion of the organs and to decrease the degree of MR.

=== Medicine ===
If the individual with acute MR is normotensive, vasodilators may be of use to decrease the afterload seen by the left ventricle and thereby decrease the regurgitant fraction. The vasodilator most commonly used is nitroprusside.

Individuals with chronic MR can be treated with vasodilators as well to decrease afterload. In the chronic state, the most commonly used agents are ACE inhibitors and hydralazine. Studies have shown that the use of ACE inhibitors and hydralazine can delay surgical treatment of MR. The current guidelines for treatment of MR limit the use of vasodilators to individuals with hypertension, however. Any hypertension is treated aggressively, e.g. by diuretics and a low sodium diet. In both hypertensive and normotensive cases, digoxin and antiarrhythmics are also indicated. Also, chronic anticoagulation is given where there is concomitant mitral valve prolapse or atrial fibrillation.

=== Surgery ===
Surgery is curative of mitral valve regurgitation. There are two surgical options for the treatment of MR: mitral valve replacement and mitral valve repair. Mitral valve repair is preferred to mitral valve replacement where a repair is feasible as bioprosthetic replacement valves have a limited lifespan of 10 to 15 years, whereas synthetic replacement valves require ongoing use of blood thinners to reduce the risk of stroke. There are two general categories of approaches to mitral valve repair: resection of the prolapsed valvular segment (sometimes referred to as the "Carpentier approach") and installation of artificial chordae to anchor the prolapsed segment to the papillary muscle (sometimes referred to as the "David approach"). With the resection approach, any prolapsing tissue is resected, in effect removing the hole through which the blood is leaking. In the artificial chordae approach, ePTFE (expanded polytetrafluoroethylene, or Gore-Tex) sutures are used to replace the broken or stretched chordae tendonae, bringing the natural tissue back into the physiological position, thus restoring the natural anatomy of the valve. With both techniques, an annuloplasty ring is typically secured to the annulus, or opening of the mitral valve, to provide additional structural support. In some cases, the "double orifice" (or Alfieri) technique for mitral valve repair, the opening of the mitral valve is sewn closed in the middle, leaving the two ends still able to open. This ensures that the mitral valve closes when the left ventricle pumps blood, yet allows the mitral valve to open at the two ends to fill the left ventricle with blood before it pumps. In general, mitral valve surgery requires "open-heart" surgery, in which the heart is arrested and the patient is placed on a heart-lung machine (cardiopulmonary bypass). This allows the complex surgery to proceed in a still environment.

Due to the physiological stress associated with open-heart surgery, elderly and very sick patients may be subject to increased risk, and may not be candidates for this type of surgery. As a consequence, there are attempts to identify means of correcting MR on a beating heart. The Alfieri technique, for instance, has been replicated using a percutaneous catheter technique, which installs a MitraClip device to hold the middle of the mitral valve closed.

Indications for surgery for chronic MR include signs of left ventricular dysfunction with ejection fraction less than 60%, severe pulmonary hypertension with pulmonary artery systolic pressure greater than 50 mmHg at rest or 60 mmHg during activity, and new-onset atrial fibrillation.

Indications for surgery for chronic MR
Symptoms	LV EF	LVESD
NYHA II	> 30 percent	< 55 mm
NYHA III-IV	< 30 percent	> 55 mm
Asymptomatic	30–60 percent	≥ 40 mm
Asymptomatic with pulmonary hypertension	LV EF > 60 percent and pulmonary artery systolic pressure >50-60 mmHg	
Asymptomatic and chance for a repair without residual MR is >90%	> 60 percent	< 40 mm

== Epidemiology ==
Significant mitral valve regurgitation has a prevalence of approximately 2% of the population, affecting males and females equally. It is one of the two most common valvular heart diseases in the elderly, and the commonest type of valvular heart disease in low and middle income countries.

In a study of 595 male elite football players aged 18–38 and 47 sedentary non-athletes, mitral regurgitation was found in 20% football players and 15% in control group. Football players with mitral regurgitation were found to have larger mitral annulus diameter compared to athletes without regurgitation, and left atrium diameter was larger in athletes with MR.

== See also ==
- Aortic regurgitation
- Pulmonary insufficiency
- Tricuspid regurgitation
