= Subacute bacterial endocarditis =

- Other names: Endocarditis lenta
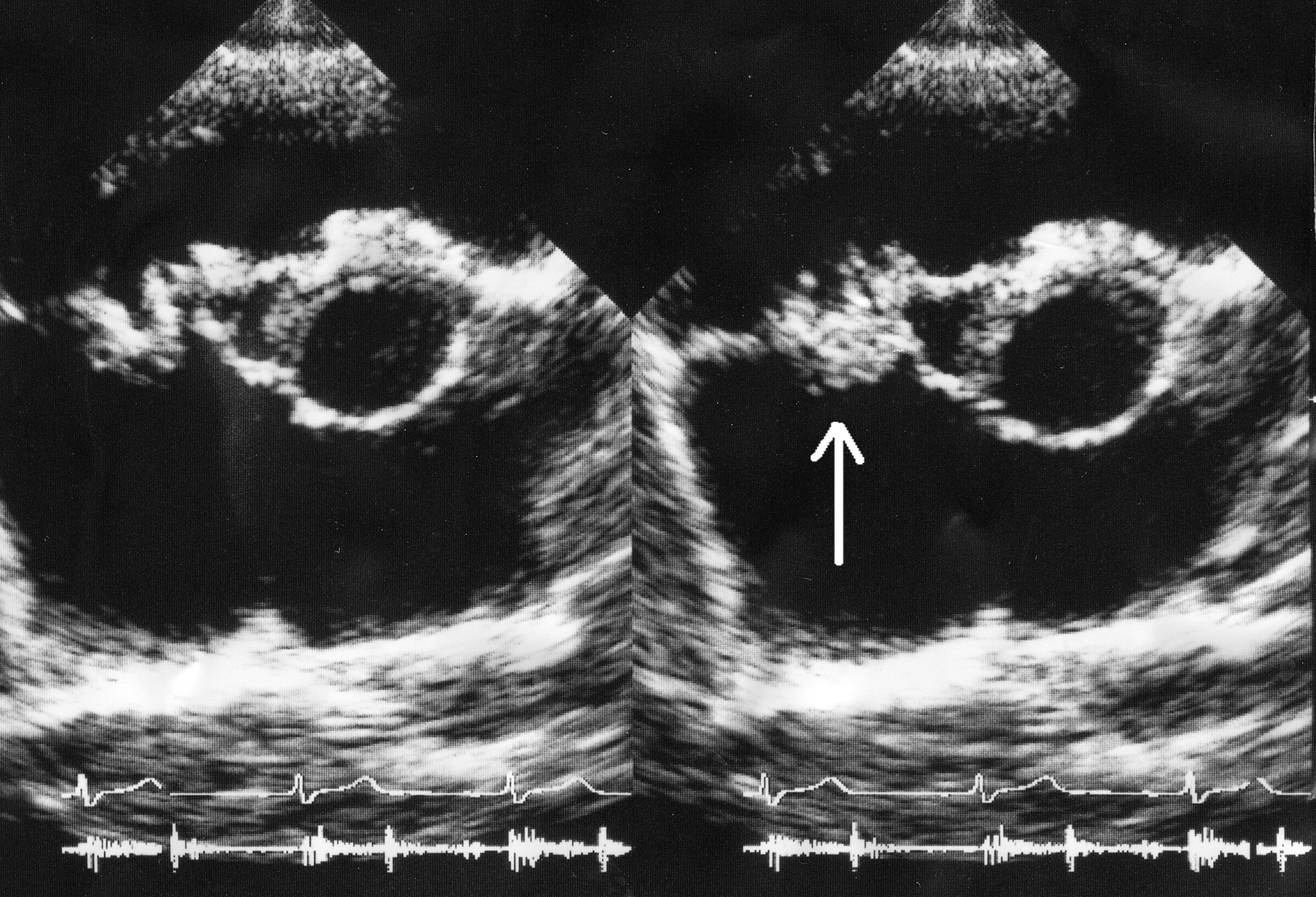
- Vegetation of tricuspid valve by ECHO
- Specialty: Cardiology
- Symptoms: Malaise, weakness
- Causes: Streptococcus mutans, mitis, sanguis or milleri bacteria
- Diagnostic method: Blood culture specimens over 24-hour period/analysis
- Treatment: Intravenous penicillin

Subacute bacterial endocarditis, abbreviated SBE, is a type of endocarditis (more specifically, infective endocarditis). Subacute bacterial endocarditis can be considered a form of type III hypersensitivity.

== Signs and symptoms ==
Among the signs of subacute bacterial endocarditis are:

- Malaise
- Weakness
- Excessive sweat
- Fever

== Causes ==
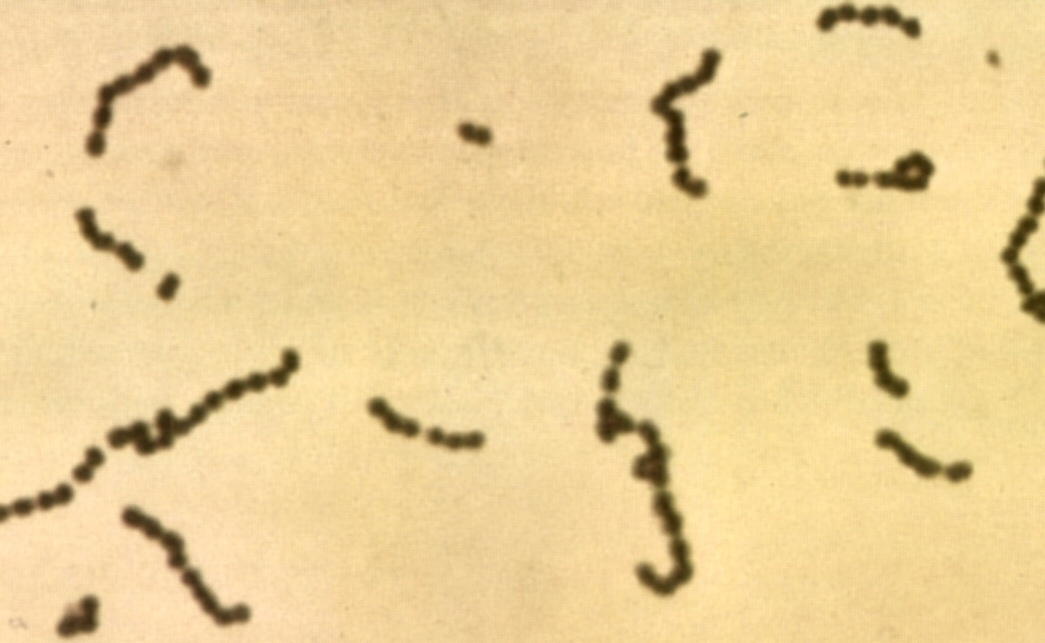
Streptococci

It is usually caused by a form of Viridans group streptococcus bacteria that normally live in the mouth (Streptococcus mutans, mitis, sanguis or milleri).

Other strains of streptococci can cause subacute endocarditis as well. These include streptococcus intermedius, which can cause acute or subacute infection (about 15% of cases pertaining to infective endocarditis).

Enterococci from urinary tract infections and coagulase negative staphylococci can also be causative agents.

== Mechanism ==
The mechanism of subacute bacterial endocarditis could be due to malformed stenotic valves which, in the company of bacteremia, become infected via adhesion and subsequent colonization of the surface area. This causes an inflammatory response, with recruitment of matrix metalloproteinases and destruction of collagen.

Underlying structural valve disease is usually present in patients before developing subacute endocarditis, and is less likely to lead to septic emboli than is acute endocarditis, but subacute endocarditis has a relatively slow process of infection and, if left untreated, can worsen for up to one year before it is fatal. In cases of subacute bacterial endocarditis, the causative organism (streptococcus viridans) needs previous heart valve disease to colonize. On the other hand, in cases of acute bacterial endocarditis the organism can colonize on the healthy heart valve, causing the disease.

== Diagnosis ==
Subacute bacterial endocarditis can be diagnosed by collecting three blood culture specimens over a 24-hour period for analysis, also it can usually be indicated by the existence of:

- Osler's nodes
- Roth's spots
- Nail clubbing

== Treatment ==
Aminoglycoside

The standard treatment is with a minimum of four weeks of high-dose intravenous penicillin with an aminoglycoside such as gentamicin. The use of high-dose antibiotics is largely based upon animal models.

Leo Loewe of Brooklyn Jewish Hospital was the first to successfully treat subacute bacterial endocarditis with penicillin. Loewe reported at the time seven cases of subacute bacterial endocarditis in 1944.

== See also ==
- Endocarditis

== Further references ==
- Goolsby, Mary Jo; Grubbs, Laurie (2011-04-28). Advanced Assessment: Interpreting Findings and Formulating Differential Diagnoses. F.A. Davis. ISBN 9780803625174.
- Silverman, Sol; Eversole, Lewis R.; Truelove, Edmond L. (2002-01-01). Essentials of Oral Medicine. PMPH-USA. ISBN 9781550091465.
- Kiefer, TL; Bashore, TM (2012). "Infective endocarditis: a comprehensive overview". Reviews in Cardiovascular Medicine. 13 (2–3): e105–20. doi:10.3909/ricm0633. PMID 23160159.
