= Heart valve =

Flap of tissue that prevent backflow of blood around the heart

- Valves of the heart in motion. The front wall of the heart is removed in this image.

Details
- System: Cardiovascular

Identifiers
- MeSH: D006351
- TA2: 3973
- FMA: 7110

Emily's heartbeat
Sound of the heart valves closing in a healthy 16 year old girl. The stethoscope is at the tricuspid area.

A heart valve (cardiac valve) is a biological one-way valve that allows blood to flow in one direction through the chambers of the heart. A mammalian heart usually has four valves. Together, the valves determine the direction of blood flow through the heart. Heart valves are opened or closed by a difference in blood pressure on each side.

The mammalian heart has two atrioventricular valves separating the upper atria from the lower ventricles: the mitral valve in the left heart, and the tricuspid valve in the right heart. The two semilunar valves are at the entrance of the arteries leaving the heart. These are the aortic valve at the aorta, and the pulmonary valve at the pulmonary artery.

The heart also has a coronary sinus valve and an inferior vena cava valve, not discussed here.

== Structure ==
Structure of the heart valves

Blood flow through the valves

The heart valves and the chambers are lined with endocardium. Heart valves separate the atria from the ventricles, or the ventricles from a blood vessel. Heart valves are situated around the fibrous rings of the cardiac skeleton. The valves incorporate flaps called leaflets or cusps, similar to a duckbill valve or flutter valve, which are pushed open to allow blood flow and which then close together to seal and prevent backflow. The mitral valve has two cusps, whereas the others have three. There are nodules at the tips of the cusps that make the seal tighter.

The pulmonary valve has left, right, and anterior cusps. The aortic valve has left, right, and posterior cusps. The tricuspid valve has anterior, posterior, and septal cusps; and the mitral valve has just anterior and posterior cusps.

The valves of the human heart can be grouped in two sets:

- Two atrioventricular valves to prevent backflow of blood from the ventricles into the atria:
  - Tricuspid valve or right atrioventricular valve, between the right atrium and right ventricle
  - Mitral valve or bicuspid valve, between the left atrium and left ventricle
- Two semilunar valves to prevent the backflow of blood into the ventricle:
  - Pulmonary valve, located at the opening between the right ventricle and the pulmonary trunk
  - Aortic valve, located at the opening between the left ventricle and the aorta.

Valve	Number of flaps/cusps	location	prevent backflow of blood
Atrioventricular valves	3 (right), 2 (left)		From the ventricles into the atria
Tricuspid valve	3	between the right atrium and right ventricle.	
Bicuspid or mitral valve	2	between the left atrium and left ventricle.	
Semilunar valves	3 (half-moon shaped) flaps		into the ventricle
Pulmonary semilunar valve	3 (half-moon shaped) flaps	at the opening between the right ventricle and the pulmonary trunk	
Aortic semilunar valve	3 (half-moon shaped) flaps	at the opening between the left ventricle and the aorta	

=== Atrioventricular valves ===
3D - loop of a heart viewed from the apex, with the apical part of the ventricles removed and the mitral valve clearly visible. Due to missing data, the leaflets of the tricuspid and aortic valves are not clearly visible, but the openings are; the pulmonary valve is not visible. On the left are two standard 2D views (taken from the 3D dataset) showing tricuspid and mitral valves (above) and aortal valve (below).

The atrioventricular valves are the mitral valve, and the tricuspid valve, which are situated between the atria and the ventricles, and prevent backflow from the ventricles into the atria during systole. They are anchored to the walls of the ventricles by chordae tendineae, which prevent them from inverting.

The chordae tendineae are attached to papillary muscles that cause tension to better hold the valve. Together, the papillary muscles and the chordae tendineae are known as the subvalvular apparatus. The function of the subvalvular apparatus is to keep the valves from prolapsing into the atria when they close. The subvalvular apparatus has no effect on the opening and closure of the valves, however, which is caused entirely by the pressure gradient across the valve. The peculiar insertion of chords on the leaflet free margin, however, provides systolic stress sharing between chords according to their different thickness.

The closure of the AV valves is heard as lub, the first heart sound (S1). The closure of the SL valves is heard as dub, the second heart sound (S2).

The mitral valve is also called the bicuspid valve because it contains two leaflets or cusps. The mitral valve gets its name from the resemblance to a bishop's mitre (a type of hat). It is on the left side of the heart and allows the blood to flow from the left atrium into the left ventricle.

During diastole, a normally-functioning mitral valve opens as a result of increased pressure from the left atrium as it fills with blood (preloading). As atrial pressure increases above that of the left ventricle, the mitral valve opens. Opening facilitates the passive flow of blood into the left ventricle. Diastole ends with atrial contraction, which ejects the final 30% of blood that is transferred from the left atrium to the left ventricle. This amount of blood is known as the end diastolic volume (EDV), and the mitral valve closes at the end of atrial contraction to prevent a reversal of blood flow.

The tricuspid valve has three leaflets or cusps and is on the right side of the heart. It is between the right atrium and the right ventricle, and stops the backflow of blood between the two.

=== Semilunar valves ===
The aortic and pulmonary valves are located at the base of the aorta and the pulmonary trunk respectively. These are also called the "semilunar valves". These two arteries receive blood from the ventricles and their semilunar valves permit blood to be forced into the arteries, and prevent backflow from the arteries into the ventricles. These valves do not have chordae tendineae, and are more similar to the valves in artery than they are to the atrioventricular valves. The closure of the semilunar valves causes the second heart sound.

The aortic valve, which has three cusps, lies between the left ventricle and the aorta. During ventricular systole, pressure rises in the left ventricle and when it is greater than the pressure in the aorta, the aortic valve opens, allowing blood to exit the left ventricle into the aorta. When ventricular systole ends, pressure in the left ventricle rapidly drops and the pressure in the aorta forces the aortic valve to close. The closure of the aortic valve contributes the A2 component of the second heart sound.

The pulmonary valve (sometimes referred to as the pulmonic valve) lies between the right ventricle and the pulmonary artery, and has three cusps. Similar to the aortic valve, the pulmonary valve opens in ventricular systole, when the pressure in the right ventricle rises above the pressure in the pulmonary artery. At the end of ventricular systole, when the pressure in the right ventricle falls rapidly, the pressure in the pulmonary artery will close the pulmonary valve. The closure of the pulmonary valve contributes the P2 component of the second heart sound. The right heart is a low-pressure system, so the P2 component of the second heart sound is usually softer than the A2 component of the second heart sound. However, it is physiologically normal in some young people to hear both components separated during inhalation.

=== Development ===
In the developing heart, the valves between the atria and ventricles, the bicuspid and the tricuspid valves, develop on either side of the atrioventricular canals. The upward extension of the bases of the ventricles causes the canal to become invaginated into the ventricle cavities. The invaginated margins form the rudiments of the lateral cusps of the AV valves. The middle and septal cusps develop from the downward extension of the septum intermedium.

The semilunar valves (the pulmonary and aortic valves) are formed from four thickenings at the cardiac end of the truncus arteriosus. These thickenings are called endocardial cushions. The truncus arteriosus is originally a single outflow tract from the embryonic heart that will later split to become the ascending aorta and pulmonary trunk. Before it has split, four thickenings occur. There are anterior, posterior, and two lateral thickenings. A septum begins to form between what will later become the ascending aorta and pulmonary tract. As the septum forms, the two lateral thickenings are split, so that the ascending aorta and pulmonary trunk have three thickenings each (an anterior or posterior, and half of each of the lateral thickenings). The thickenings are the origins of the three cusps of the semilunar valves. The valves are visible as unique structures by the ninth week. As they mature, they rotate slightly as the outward vessels spiral, and move slightly closer to the heart.

== Physiology ==
In general, the motion of the heart valves is determined using the Navier–Stokes equation, using boundary conditions of the blood pressures, pericardial fluid, and external loading as the constraints. The motion of the heart valves is used as a boundary condition in the Navier–Stokes equation in determining the fluid dynamics of blood ejection from the left and right ventricles into the aorta and the lung.

Wiggers diagram, showing various events during a cardiac cycle, with closures and openings of the aortic and mitral marked in the pressure curves.

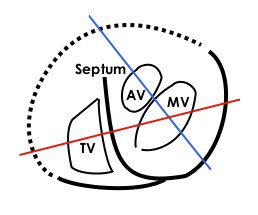
This is further explanation of the echocardiogram above. MV: Mitral valve, TV: Tricuspid valve, AV: Aortic valve, Septum: Interventricular septum. Continuous lines demarcate septum and free wall seen in echocardiogram, dotted line is a suggestion of where the free wall of the right ventricle should be. The red line represents where the upper left loop in the echocardiogram transects the 3D-loop, the blue line represents the lower loop.

Relationship between pressure and flow in open valves

The pressure drop, ${\Delta}p$, across an open heart valve relates to the flow rate, Q, through the valve:

$$a{{\partial}Q\over{\partial}t} + bQ^2 = {\Delta}p$$

If:

- Inflow energy conserved
- Stagnant region behind leaflets
- Outflow momentum conserved
- Flat velocity profile

Valves with a single degree of freedom

Usually, the aortic and mitral valves are incorporated in valve studies within a single degree of freedom. These relationships are based on the idea of the valve being a structure with a single degree of freedom. These relationships are based on the Euler equations.

Equations for the aortic valve in this case:

$${\rho}\left({{\partial}u\over{\partial}t} + {u{\partial}u\over{\partial}x}\right) + {{\partial}p\over{\partial}x} = 0$$

$${{\partial}A\over{\partial}t} + {{\partial}\over{\partial}x}(Au) = 0$$

$$A(x,t) = A_0 \left(1-[1-{\Lambda}(t)]{x\over{L}}\right)^2$$

$$\int_{0}^{L} p(x,t) {{\partial}A\over{\partial}x}\, dx = [A_0 - A(L,t)] \, p(L,t)$$

where:

u = axial velocity
p = pressure
A = cross sectional area of valve
L = axial length of valve
Λ(t) = single degree of freedom; when
$$\Lambda^2 (t) = {A(L,t)\over A_0}$$

Atrioventricular valve

== Clinical significance ==
Mitral Valve Prolapse murmur
Heart sounds of a 16 year old girl diagnosed with mitral valve prolapse and mitral regurgitation. Auscultating her heart, a systolic murmur and click is heard. Recorded with the stethoscope over the mitral valve.

Valvular heart disease is a general term referring to dysfunction of the valves, and is primarily in two forms, either regurgitation, (also insufficiency, or incompetence) where a dysfunctional valve lets blood flow in the wrong direction, or stenosis, when a valve is narrow.

Regurgitation occurs when a valve becomes insufficient and malfunctions, allowing some blood to flow in the wrong direction. This insufficiency can affect any of the valves as in aortic insufficiency, mitral insufficiency, pulmonary insufficiency and tricuspid insufficiency. The other form of valvular heart disease is stenosis, a narrowing of the valve. This is a result of the valve becoming thickened and any of the heart valves can be affected, as in mitral valve stenosis, tricuspid valve stenosis, pulmonary valve stenosis and aortic valve stenosis. Stenosis of the mitral valve is a common complication of rheumatic fever. Inflammation of the valves can be caused by infective endocarditis, usually a bacterial infection but can sometimes be caused by other organisms. Bacteria can more readily attach to damaged valves. Another type of endocarditis which doesn't provoke an inflammatory response, is nonbacterial thrombotic endocarditis. This is commonly found on previously undamaged valves. A major valvular heart disease is mitral valve prolapse, which is a weakening of connective tissue called myxomatous degeneration of the valve. This sees the displacement of a thickened mitral valve cusp into the left atrium during systole.

Disease of the heart valves can be congenital, such as aortic regurgitation or acquired, for example infective endocarditis. Different forms are associated with cardiovascular disease, connective tissue disorders and hypertension. The symptoms of the disease will depend on the affected valve, the type of disease, and the severity of the disease. For example, valvular disease of the aortic valve, such as aortic stenosis or aortic regurgitation, may cause breathlessness, whereas valvular diseases of the tricuspid valve may lead to dysfunction of the liver and jaundice. When valvular heart disease results from infectious causes, such as infective endocarditis, an affected person may have a fever and unique signs such as splinter haemorrhages of the nails, Janeway lesions, Osler nodes and Roth spots. A particularly feared complication of valvular disease is the creation of emboli because of turbulent blood flow, and the development of heart failure.

Valvular heart disease is diagnosed by echocardiography, which is a form of ultrasound. Damaged and defective heart valves can be repaired, or replaced with artificial heart valves. Infectious causes may also require treatment with antibiotics.

=== Congenital heart disease ===
The most common form of valvular anomaly is a congenital heart defect (CHD), called a bicuspid aortic valve. This results from the fusing of two of the cusps during embryonic development forming a bicuspid valve instead of a tricuspid valve. This condition is often undiagnosed until calcific aortic stenosis has developed, and this usually happens around ten years earlier than would otherwise develop.

Less common CHD's are tricuspid and pulmonary atresia, and Ebstein's anomaly. Tricuspid atresia is the complete absence of the tricuspid valve which can lead to an underdeveloped or absent right ventricle. Pulmonary atresia is the complete closure of the pulmonary valve. Ebstein's anomaly is the displacement of the septal leaflet of the tricuspid valve causing a larger atrium and a smaller ventricle than normal.

== History ==
Heart valves were first documented by Leonardo da Vinci over 500 years ago. Da Vinci achieved this by doing dissections on cows, pigs, and humans and studying the dissections. Da Vinci also performed vivo studies on pigs, by using small metallic tracers to analyze the movement of blood in the heart. Da Vinci made wax casts of the bull heart to construct glass models of the bull heart to study the hydraulic characteristics of blood flowing through the heart and heart valves. This was done to make a circulation model that would mimic human circulation. Da Vinci used seeds to visualize turbulences and blood flow.

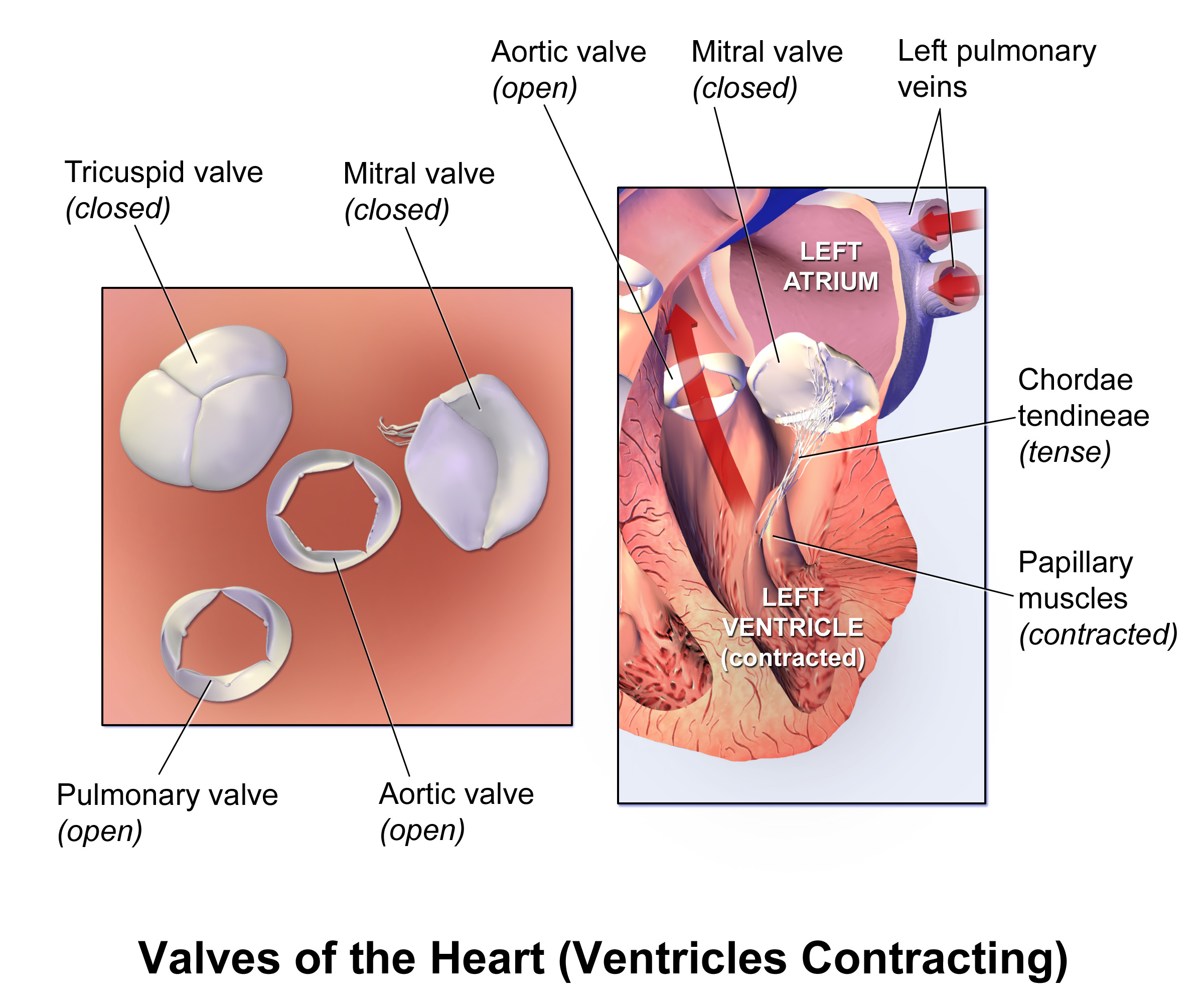
Illustration of the valves of the heart when the ventricles are contracting.

The first medically proven and adopted artificial heart valve was the Starr-Edwards valve, invented by Miles "Lowell" Edwards. The valve was first implanted in a patient in 1960 and remained in use, globally, until it was replaced in 2007 by Edwards' company, Edwards Lifesciences, with a new ring design. Types of artificial heart valve include pericardial heart valves and the Bjork–Shiley valve.
