= Warren C. Jyrch =

Warren C. Jyrch (June 22, 1921, in Illinois – March 2, 1971, in Chicago, Illinois) is known for being the first ever hemophiliac to ever attempt and survive an open heart surgery. Due to the dangers of being a hemophiliac the surgery to replace Jyrch's heart valve was very risky. Another constraint of this surgery was the amount of blood needed, "2,400 pints of blood were necessary for Jyrch's operation." Jyrch worked as an accountant for Rock Island Railroad. He died on March 2, 1971, due to a stroke; it was later discovered that his death was not related to his surgery months before. Jyrch left behind his wife Helen, and his three daughters, Christine, Eileen, and Paula.
