= List of cardiology mnemonics =

This is a list of cardiology mnemonics, categorized and alphabetized. For mnemonics in other medical specialities, see this list of medical mnemonics.

== Aortic regurgitation: causes ==
CREAM:

Congenital

Rheumatic damage

Endocarditis

Aortic dissection/ Aortic root dilatation

Marfan’s

== Aortic stenosis characteristics ==
SAD:^{p. 29}

Syncope

Angina

Dyspnoea

== Aortic to right Subclavian path ==
ABC'S^{p. 1}

Aortic arch gives rise to:

Brachiocephalic trunk

Left Common Carotid

Left Subclavian

== Heart valves (right to left) ==
Toilet Paper My Ass, or They Pay Me Alcohol, or Thugs Push Me Around.

Tricuspid valve

Pulmonary semilunar valve

Mitral (bicuspid) valve

Aortic semilunar valve

== Apex beat: abnormalities found on palpation, causes of impalpable ==
HILT:^{p. 29}

Heaving

Impalpable

Laterally displaced

Thrusting/ Tapping

If it's impalpable, causes are COPD:^{p. 29}

COPD

Obesity

Pleural, Pericardial effusion

Dextrocardia

== Atrial Arrhythmias ==
Anticoagulants: To prevent embolization.

Beta blockers: To block the effects of certain hormones on the heart to slow the heart rate.

Calcium Channel Blockers: Help slow the heart rate by blocking the number of electrical impulses that pass through the AV node into the lower heart chambers (ventricles).

Digoxin: Helps slow the heart rate by blocking the number of electrical impulses that pass through the AV node into the lower heart chambers (ventricles).

Electrocardioversion: A procedure in which electric currents are used to reset the heart's rhythm back to regular pattern.

== Atrial Fibrillation causes ==
Pirates:^{p. 3}

Pulmonary: PE, COPD

Iatrogenic

Rheumatic heart: mitral regurgitation

Atherosclerotic: MI, CAD

Thyroid: hyperthyroid

Endocarditis

Sick sinus syndrome

== Atrial fibrillation management ==
ABCD:^{p. 30}

Anti-coagulate

Beta-block to control rate

Cardiovert

Digoxin

== Beck's triad (cardiac tamponade) ==
3 D's:^{p. 30}

Diminished heart sounds

Distended jugular veins

Decreased arterial pressure

== Betablockers: cardioselective betablockers ==
Betablockers Acting Exclusively At Myocardium:^{p. 30}

Betaxolol

Acebutelol

Esmolol

Atenolol

Metoprolol

== CHF Treatment ==
LMNOP

Lasix

Morphine

Nitrites

Oxygen

VassoPressors

== CHF: causes of exacerbation ==
FAILURE^{p. 30}

Forgot medication

Arrhythmia/ Anaemia

Ischemia/ Infarction/ Infection

Lifestyle: taken too much salt

Upregulation of CO: pregnancy, hyperthyroidism

Renal failure

Embolism: pulmonary

== Complications of Myocardial Infarction ==
Darth Vader

Death

Arrhythmia

Rupture(free ventricular wall/ ventricular septum/ papillary muscles)

Tamponade

Heart failure (acute or chronic)

Valve disease

Aneurysm of Ventricles

Dressler's Syndrome

thromboEmbolism (mural thrombus)

Recurrence/ mitral Regurgitation

== Coronary artery bypass graft: indications ==
DUST:^{p. 31}

Depressed ventricular function

Unstable angina

Stenosis of the left main stem

Triple vessel disease

== ECG: left vs. right bundle block ==
WiLLiaM MaRRoW:^{p. 31}

W pattern in V1-V2 and M pattern in V3-V6 is Left bundle block.

M pattern in V1-V2 and W in V3-V6 is Right bundle block.

== Exercise ramp ECG: contraindications ==
RAMP:^{p. 31}

Recent MI

Aortic stenosis

MI in the last 7 days

Pulmonary hypertension

== Endocarditis ==
FROM JANE:

Fever

Roth's spots

Osler's nodes

Murmur of heart

Janeway lesions

Anemia

- Nail hemorrhage

Emboli

== Heart valve sequence ==
Try Puling My Aorta:^{p. 3}

Tricuspid

Pulmonary

Mitral (bicuspid)

Aorta

== Heart blocks ==
If the R is far from P, then you have a First Degree.

Longer, longer, longer, drop! Then you have a Wenkebach.

if some P's don't get through, then you have Mobitz II.

If P's and Q's don't agree, then you have a Third Degree.

== Infarctions ==
INFARCTIONS^{p. 34}

IV access

Narcotic analgesics (e.g. morphine, pethidine)

Facilities for defibrillation (DF)

Aspirin/ Anticoagulant (heparin)

Rest

Converting enzyme inhibitor

Thrombolysis

IV beta blocker

Oxygen 60%

Nitrates

Stool Softeners

== JVP: wave form ==
ASK ME^{p. 32}

Atrial contraction

Systole (ventricular contraction)

Klosure (closure) of tricuspid valve, so atrial filling

Maximal atrial filling

Emptying of atrium

== MI: basic management ==
BOOMAR:^{p. 32}

Bed rest

Oxygen

Opiate

Monitor

Anticoagulate

Reduce clot size

== MI: signs and symptoms ==
PULSE:^{p. 32}

Persistent chest pains

Upset stomach

Lightheadedness

Shortness of breath

Excessive sweating

== MI: therapeutic treatment ==
O BATMAN!^{p. 32}

Oxygen

Beta blocker

ASA

Thrombolytics (e.g. heparin)

Morphine

Ace prn

Nitroglycerin

== MI: treatment of acute MI ==
COAG:^{p. 32}

Cyclomorph

Oxygen

Aspirin

Glycerol trinitrate

== Murmur attributes ==
"IL PQRST" (person has ill PQRST heart waves):^{p. 32}

Intensity

Location

Pitch

Quality

Radiation

Shape

Timing

== Murmurs: innocent murmur features ==
8 S's:^{p. 32}

Soft

Systolic

Short

Sounds (S1 & S2) normal

Symptomless

Special tests normal (X-ray, EKG)

Standing/ Sitting (vary with position)

Sternal depression

== Murmurs: louder with inspiration vs expiration ==
LEft sided murmurs louder with Expiration

RIght sided murmurs louder with Inspiration.^{p. 32}

== Murmurs: questions to ask ==
SCRIPT:^{p. 32}

Site

Character (e.g. harsh, soft, blowing)

Radiation

Intensity

Pitch

Timing

== Murmurs: systolic vs. diastolic ==
PASS:Pulmonic & Aortic

Stenosis=Systolic.

PAID: Pulmonic & Aortic

Insufficiency=Diastolic.^{p. 32}

== Pericarditis: causes ==
CARDIAC RIND:^{p. 34}

Collagen vascular disease

Aortic aneurysm

Radiation

Drugs (such as hydralazine)

Infections

Acute renal failure

Cardiac infarction

Rheumatic fever

Injury

Neoplasms

Dressler's syndrome

== Pericarditis: EKG ==
PericarditiS:^{p. 34}

PR depression in precordial leads.

ST elevation.

== Peripheral vascular insufficiency: inspection criteria ==
SICVD:^{p. 34}

Symmetry of leg musculature

Integrity of skin

Color of toenails

Varicose veins

Distribution of hair

== Pulseless electrical activity: causes ==
PATCH MED:^{p. 34}

Pulmonary embolus

Acidosis

Tension pneumothorax

Cardiac tamponade

Hypokalemia/ Hyperkalemia/ Hypoxia/ Hypothermia/ Hypovolemia

Myocardial infarction

Electrolyte derangements

Drugs

== ST elevation causes in ECG ==
ELEVATION:^{p. 34}

Electrolytes

LBBB

Early repolarization

Ventricular hypertrophy

Aneurysm

Treatment (e.g. pericardiocentesis)

Injury (AMI, contusion)

Osborne waves (hypothermia)

Non-occlusive vasospasm

== Supraventricular tachycardia: treatment ==
ABCDE:^{p. 35}

Adenosine

Beta-blocker

Calcium channel antagonist

Digoxin

Excitation (vagal stimulation)

== Ventricular tachycardia: treatment ==
LAMB:^{p. 35}

Lidocaine

Amiodarone

Mexiltene/ Magnesium

Beta-blocker

== White Blood Cell Count ==
Never let monkeys eat bananas:

Neutrophils

lymphocytes

monocytes

eosinophils

basophils
