= Vegetation (pathology) =

Abnormal growths in the heart associated with endocarditis

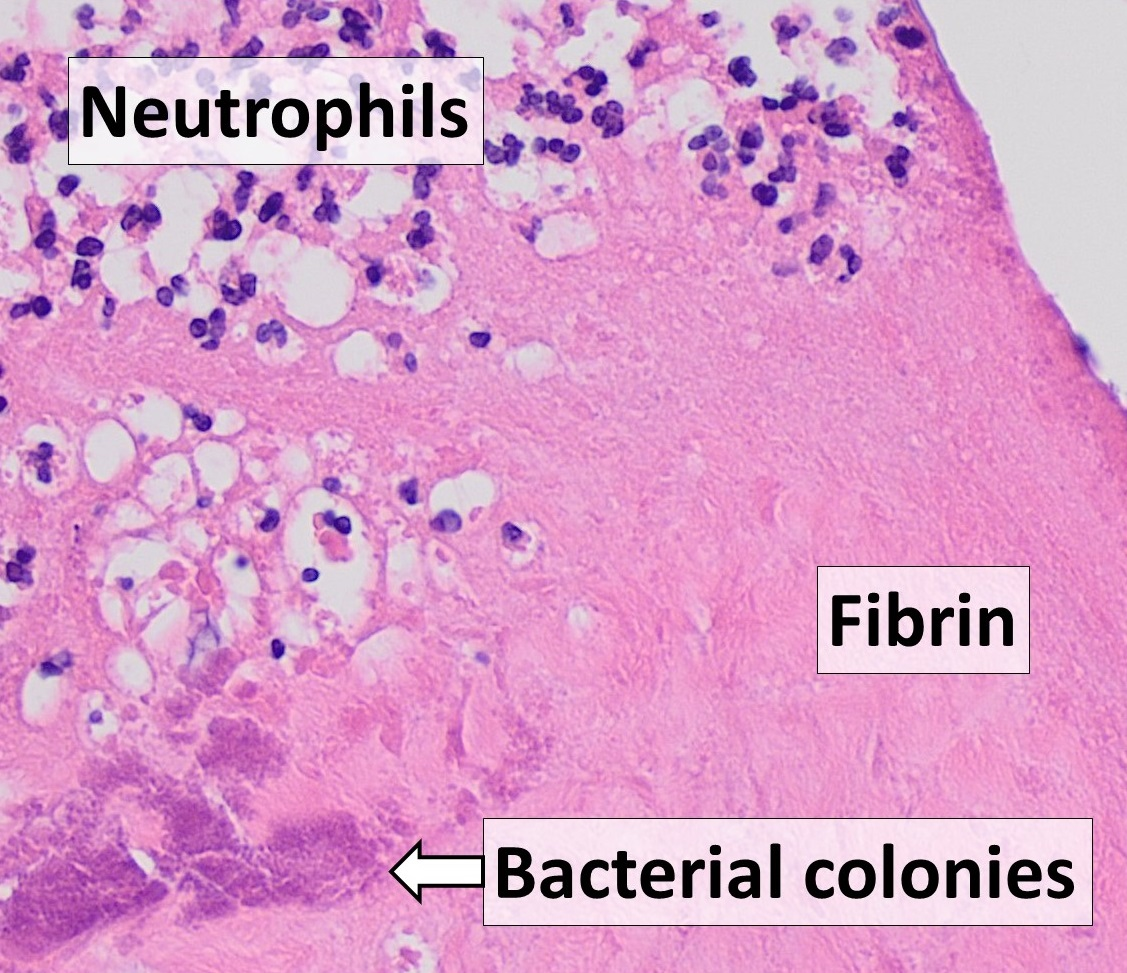
Histopathology of a vegetation of bacterial endocarditis, taken from a valve repair, H&E stain.

In medicine, a vegetation is an abnormal growth named for its similarity to natural vegetation. Vegetations are often associated with endocarditis. They can be made of fibrin and platelets.

== Types ==
Certain conditions are associated with specific vegetation patterns:

Condition	Size	Infective?
Infective endocarditis related to Staphylococcus aureus	Generally large	Yes
Rheumatic fever related to Streptococcus pyogenes	Typically small	
Libman–Sacks endocarditis related to systemic lupus erythematosus	Small	No (sterile)
Nonbacterial thrombotic endocarditis (NBTE)	Small	No (sterile)
