= Lazare Rivière =

French physician (b. 1589, d. 1655)

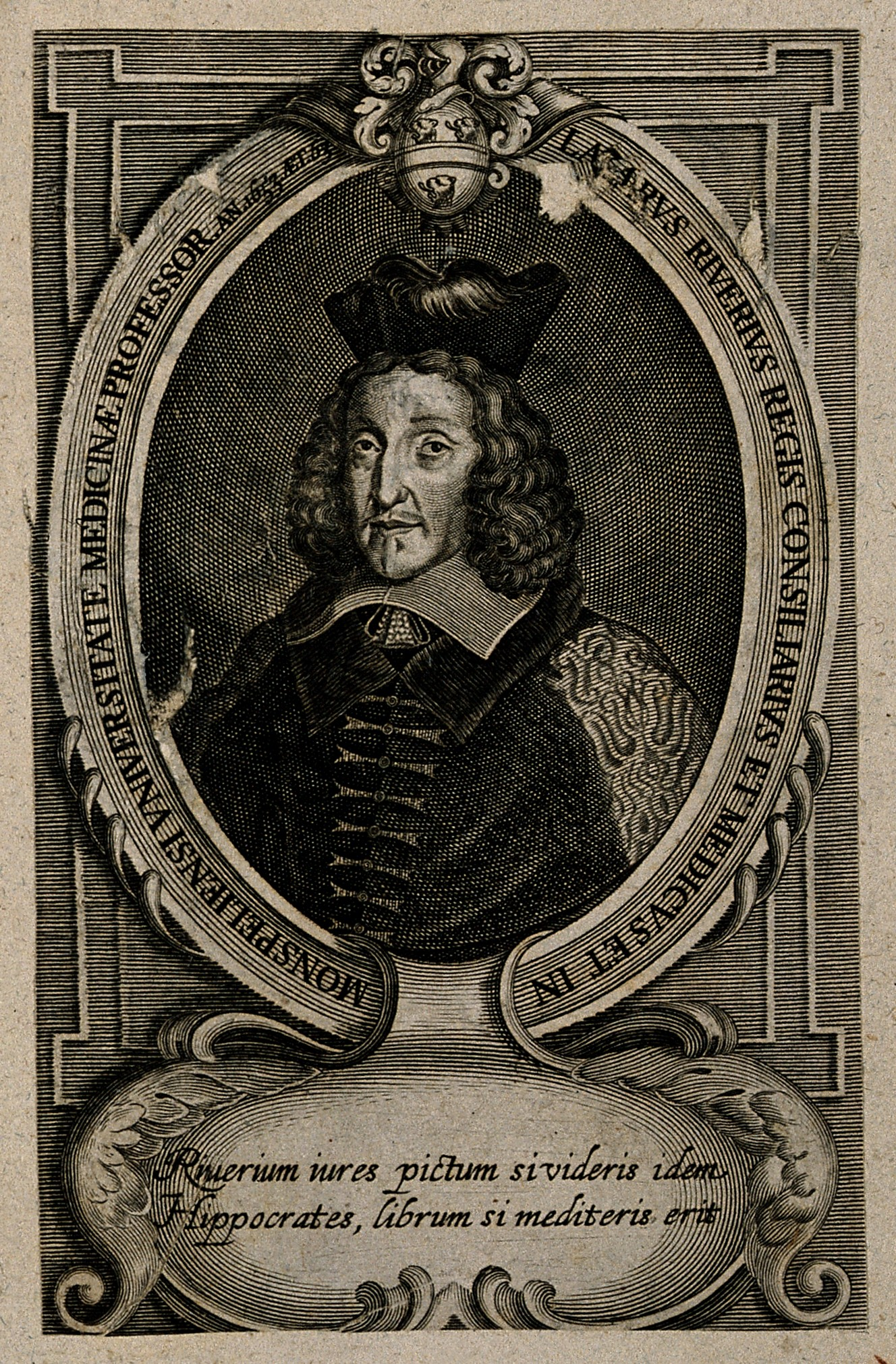
- Born: Montpellier
- Occupations: Surgeon, lecturer
- Known for: First description of aortic valve disease, Counselor and Physician King of France
- Medical career
- Profession: Physician, surgeon
- Institutions: University of Montpellier
- Sub-specialties: Anatomy, pharmacology
- Notable works: Opera medica universa, Praxis medica cum theoria

Lazare Rivière (September 1589 - 16 April 1655) was a French physician who made influential contributions to early modern medicine. During his career he specialized in pharmacology, anatomy, and surgery and was the first physician to describe aortic valve inflammation. He was a leading professor at the University of Montpellier and served as a physician to King Louis XIII.

== Early life and education ==
Lazare Rivière was born in Montpellier, Languedoc, France in September 1589 to Martin and Jacquette Rivière. His childhood is obscure, but Rivière was raised as Protestant. He was accepted into the University of Montpellier in 1606 and passed his baccalaureate on 28 January 1608. Rivière received his medical license in late 1610 or early 1611 before he received his doctorate in the middle of 1611 after writing his dissertation.

== Medical career ==
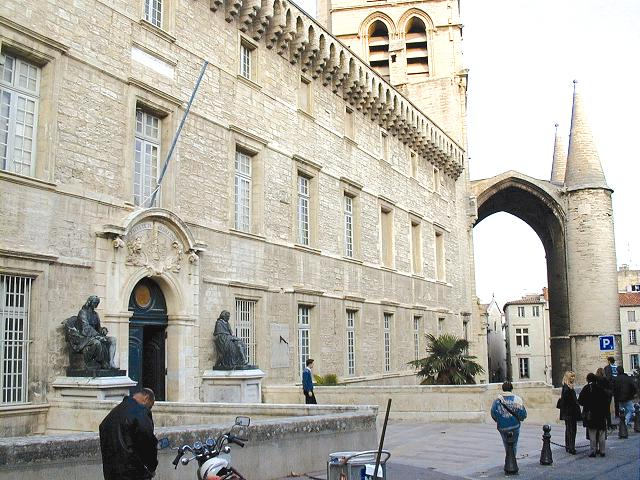
Rivière was a Professor of Medicine at the University of Montpellier.

Rivière applied to be a candidate for the Chair of Surgery and Pharmacy at the University of Montpellier's school of medicine in 1617, but was initially passed over in favor of a Catholic candidate, Laurent Coudin, in 1619. However, Coudin died shortly after and Rivière was granted the position in 1622. At the University of Montpellier, one of early modern Europe's leading medical schools, Rivière introduced the teaching of chemistry. He turned down job offers by the University of Toulouse and University of Bologna to focus his research and work in Montpellier, and retained his position as professor at the university for life. He later became a physician to King Louis XIII of France.

Rivière is credited as the first physician to describe aortic valve disease. During an autopsy of a patient in 1646 who died featuring symptoms of heart failure, Rivière described hazelnut-like blockages obstructing the patients left ventricle at the opening to the aortic valve. He further observed that the aortic valve was "hardened." This work was described by French Physician René Laennec as the first descriptions of aortic endocarditis.

Rivière specialized in pharmacology and strongly believed most illnesses required aggressive medicinal treatment. He created a variety of potions and drugs he used as medicines and collected around four hundred "very remarkable cures" from his practice and others'. He became known for a concoction used to treat venereal disease called "Potio Rivierii" or "Rivière's potion," which featured burdock as a main ingredient and was used as a folk remedy for centuries afterwards. Another famous mixture of his was "L'anti-émétique de Rivière" which was a mixture of coffee and lime designed to prevent vomiting. Rivière also used laudanum, a mixture of opium and wine, to treat severe pain.

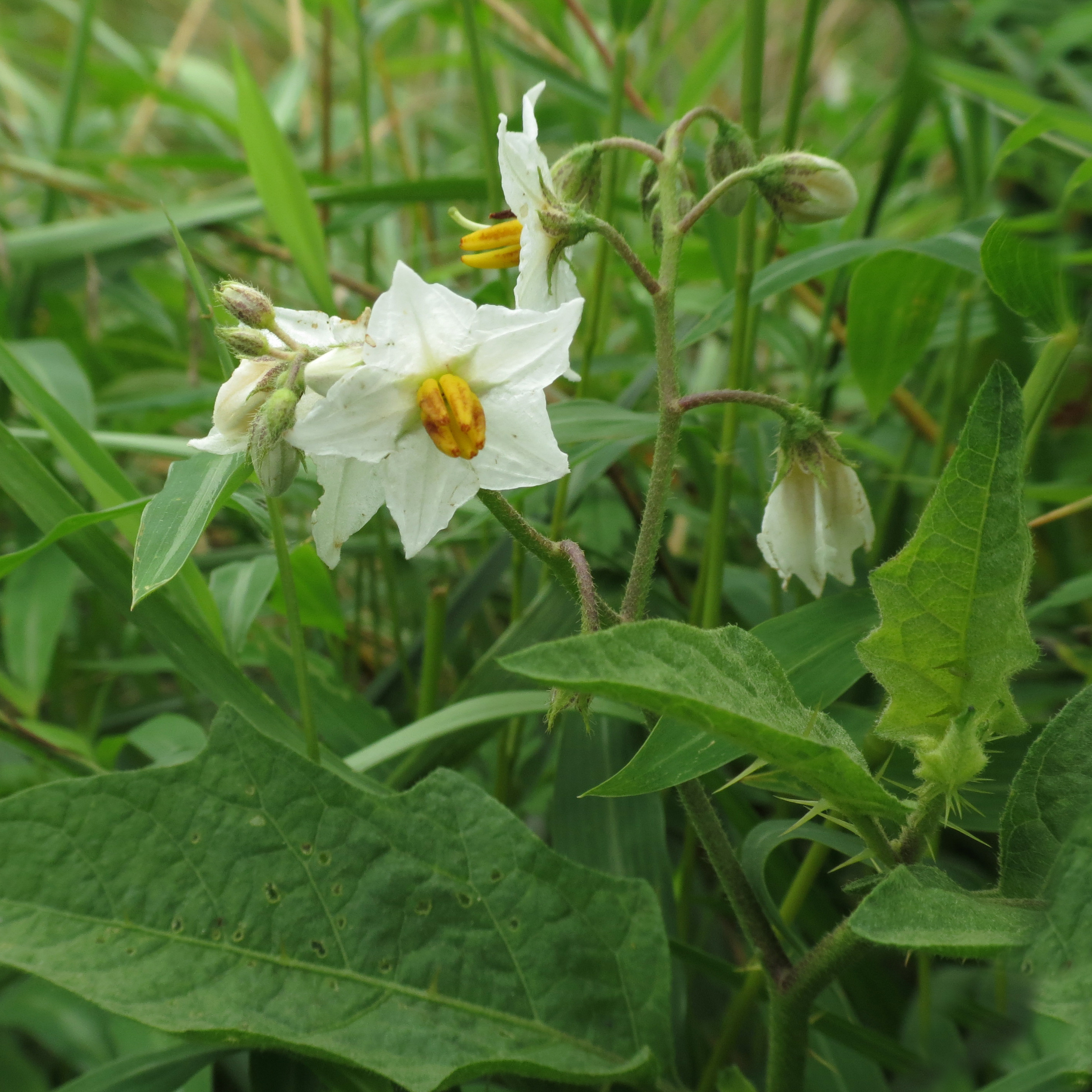
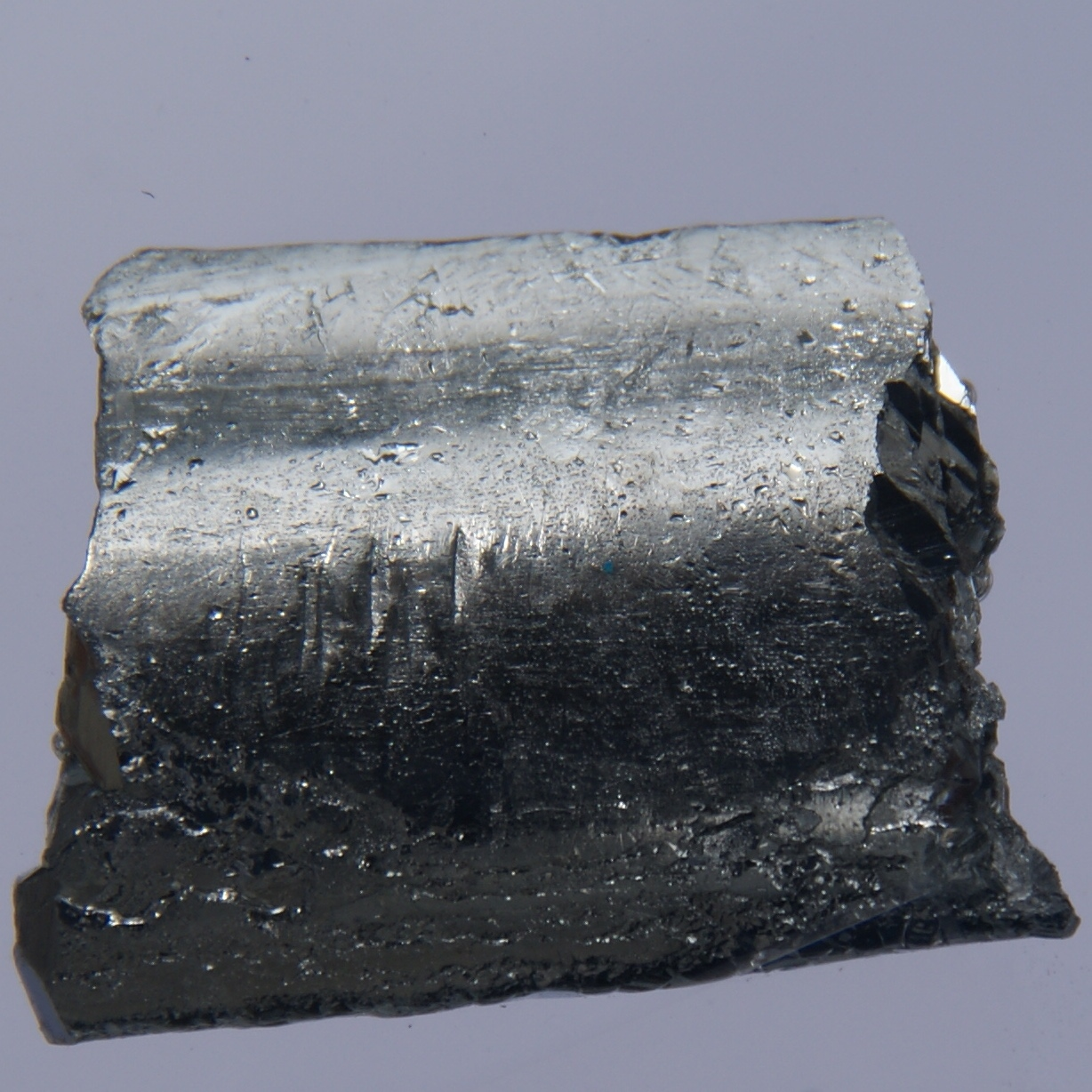
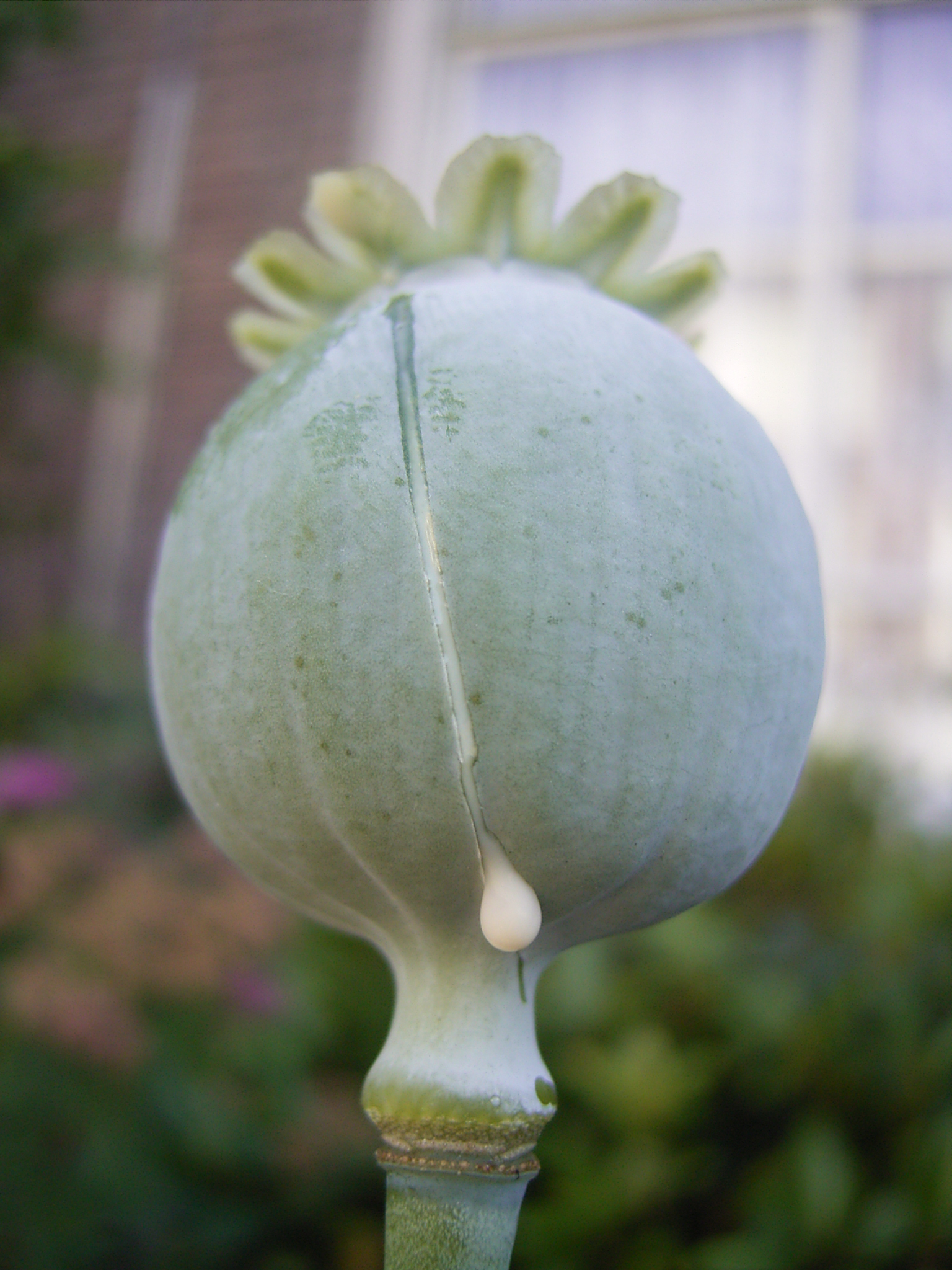
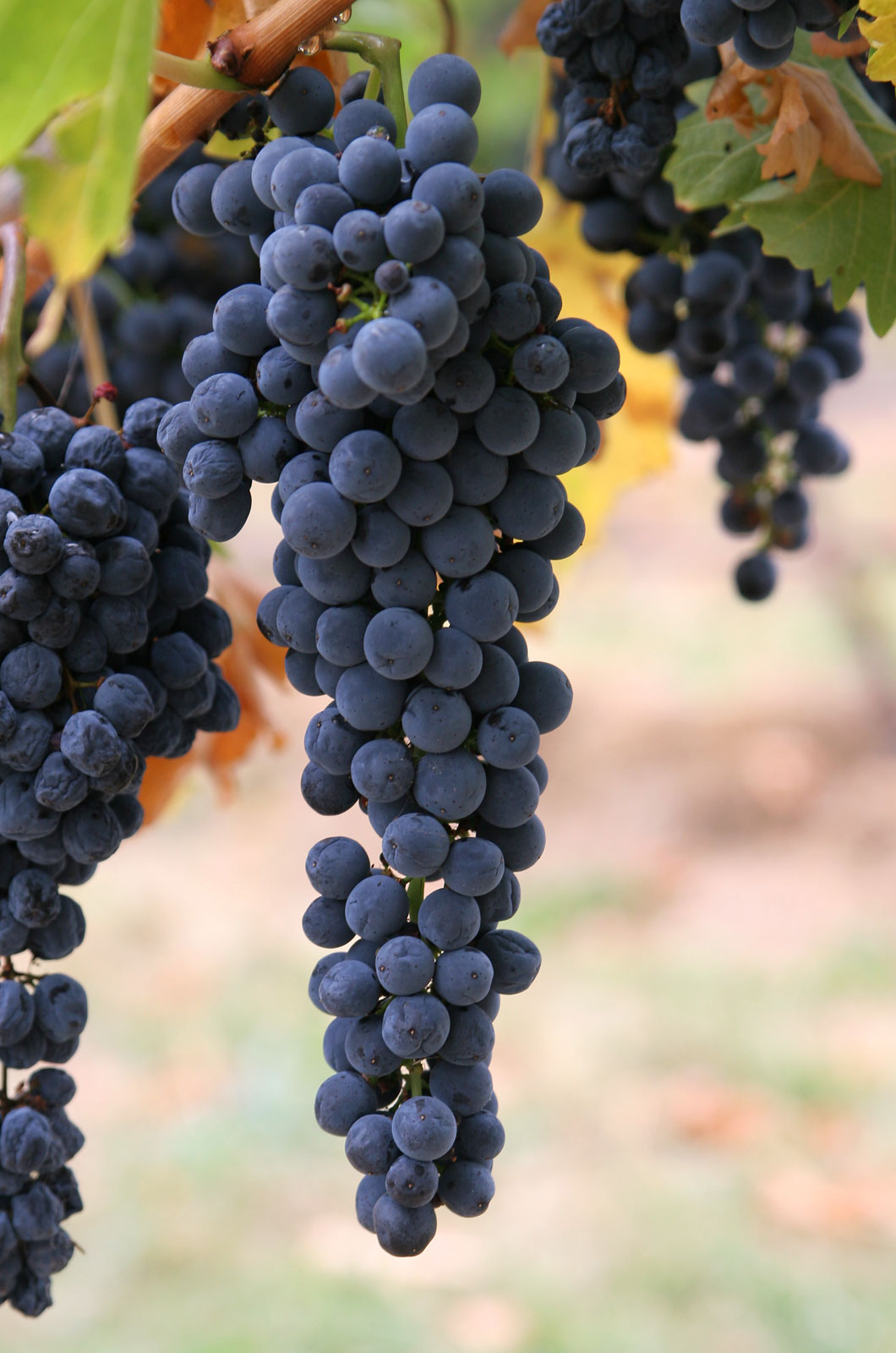
Rivière used a variety of ingredients in his treatments, including nightshade, antimony, opium, and wine

Rivière also performed dentistry. For cleaning teeth, he proposed brushes of tobacco ashes, alum-based mixtures, or sulfuric acid. He treated cavities with cotton swabs dipped in oils of clove, camphor, or boxwood and conducted root canals with cautery, sulfuric acid, or nitric acid.

== Personal life ==
Rivière converted to Catholicism around the time he was appointed Chair of Surgery and Pharmacy at the University of Montpellier. During his career he gained fame and recognition throughout Europe for his research and service to the king. He married Jeanne de Volontant on 28 December 1628. In 1640 he finished writing the first of 17 books in his Praxis medica series, which were published in a single volume in 1655 and gained audiences in both France and England. Lazare Rivière died on 16 April 1655 in Montpellier.

== Notable works ==
Rivière was the author of numerous texts, some of which were published after his death. His works covered a variety of medical topics including the history of epidemics, surgical methods, disease descriptions, treatments, and anatomy.

- Pro suprema laurea Apollinari quaestiones medicae Cardinales quatuor auibus accesserunt assertiones et paradoxa 500 ex singuilis medicinae partibus et hermetica philosophia (1611)
  - Dissertation
- Praxis medica cum theoria (1640 - 1655)
  - A series of 17 books discussing different fields of medicine and medical theories of the time. Translated from the original Latin to French by M.F. Deboze and English by Nicholas Culpeper, Peter Cole, Abdiah Cole, and William Rowland during the 17th Century. After Rivière's death, they were reprinted often into the mid-18th Century.
- Methodus Curandarum Febrium (1645)
- Observationes medicæ et curationes insignes Quibus Accesserunt Observationes ab aliis comunicatæ (1646)
- Institutiones medicæ (1655)
- Opera medica universa (1674)
  - An encyclopedia of various diseases, conditions, treatments, and events. The first edition was published in 1674 and it was reprinted until 1737.
- Arcana (1680)
