= Moritz Roth =

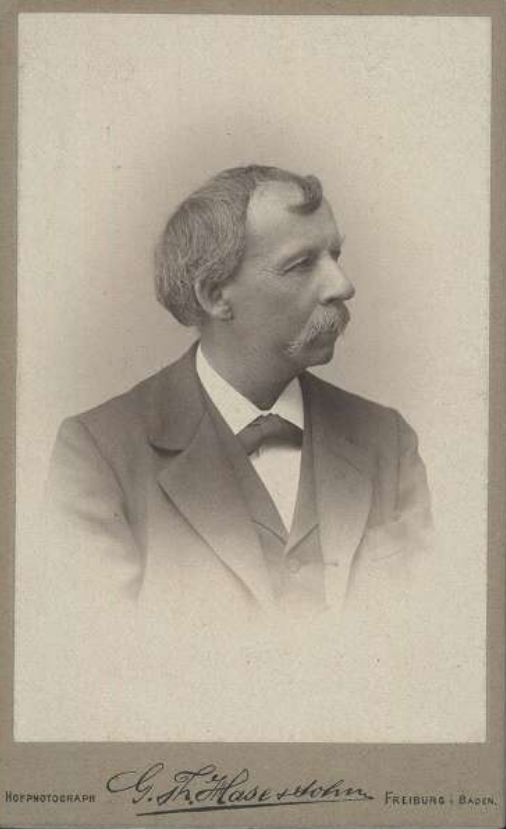
Moritz Roth.png

Moritz Roth (25 December 1839, in Basel – 4 November 1914, in Gottlieben am Untersee) was a Swiss pathologist remembered for describing Roth's spots. He studied medicine at Würzburg, Göttingen, Berlin and Basel, where he received his doctorate in 1864. He became dozent at Basel in 1866 and moved to Greifswald in 1868 before returning to the University of Basel as professor of pathology in 1872. He retired in 1898, and was succeeded by Eduard Kaufmann. His 1892 book on Andreas Vesalius remains a standard reference text.
