= Endocarditis =

Inflammation of the heart's inner layer (endocardium)

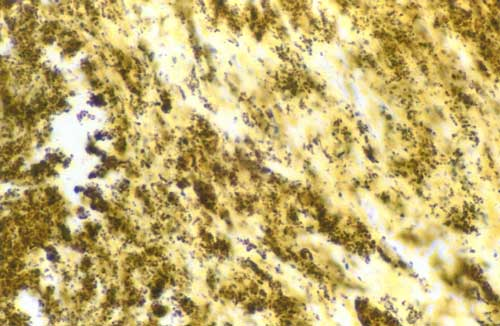
- Bartonella henselae bacilli in cardiac valve of a patient with blood culture-negative endocarditis. The bacilli appear as black granulations.
- Specialty: Cardiology, infectious disease

Endocarditis is an inflammation of the inner layer of the heart, the endocardium. It usually involves the heart valves. Other structures that may be involved include the interventricular septum, the chordae tendineae, the mural endocardium, or the surfaces of intracardiac devices. Endocarditis is characterized by lesions, known as vegetations, which are masses of platelets, fibrin, microcolonies of microorganisms, and scant inflammatory cells. In the subacute form of infective endocarditis, a vegetation may also include a center of granulomatous tissue, which may fibrose or calcify.

There are several ways to classify endocarditis. The simplest classification is based on cause: either infective or non-infective, depending on whether a microorganism is the source of the inflammation. Regardless, the diagnosis of endocarditis is based on clinical features, investigations such as an echocardiogram, and blood cultures demonstrating the presence of endocarditis-causing microorganisms.

Signs and symptoms include fever, chills, sweating, malaise, weakness, anorexia, weight loss, an enlarged spleen, flu-like feeling, cardiac murmur, heart failure, petechia (red spots on the skin), Osler's nodes (subcutaneous nodules found on hands and feet), Janeway lesions (nodular lesions on palms and soles), and Roth's spots (retinal hemorrhages).

== Infective endocarditis ==
Infective endocarditis is an infection of the inner surface of the heart, usually the valves. Symptoms may include fever, small areas of bleeding into the skin, heart murmur, feeling tired, and low red blood cells. Complications may include valvular insufficiency, heart failure, stroke, and kidney failure.

The cause is typically a bacterial infection and less commonly a fungal infection. Risk factors include valvular heart disease including rheumatic disease, congenital heart disease, artificial valves, hemodialysis, intravenous drug use, and electronic pacemakers. The bacteria most commonly involved are streptococci or staphylococci.

The diagnosis of infective endocarditis relies on the Duke criteria, which were originally described in 1994 and modified in 2000. Clinical features and microbiological examinations are the first steps to diagnose infective endocarditis. The imaging is also crucial. Echocardiography is the cornerstone imaging modality to diagnose infective endocarditis. Alternative imaging modalities as computer tomography, magnetic resonance imaging, and positron emission tomography/computer tomography (PET/CT) with 2-[18F]fluorodeoxyglucose (FDG) are playing an increasing role in the diagnosis and management of infective endocarditis.

The usefulness of antibiotics following dental procedures has changed over time. Prevention is recommended in patients at high risk. Treatment is generally with intravenous antibiotics. The choice of antibiotics is based on the blood cultures. Occasionally heart surgery is required. Populations at high risk of infective endocarditis include patients with previous infective endocarditis, patients with surgical or transcatheter prosthetic valves or post-cardiac valve repair, and patients with untreated CHD and surgically corrected congenital heart disease.

The number of people affected is about 5 per 100,000 per year. Rates, however, vary between regions of the world. Males are affected more often than females. The risk of death among those infected is about 25%. Without treatment it is almost universally fatal.

== Non-infective endocarditis ==
Nonbacterial thrombotic endocarditis (NBTE) is most commonly found on previously undamaged valves. As opposed to infective endocarditis, the vegetations in NBTE are small, sterile, and tend to aggregate along the edges of the valve or the cusps. Also, unlike infective endocarditis, NBTE does not cause an inflammatory response from the body. NBTE usually occurs during a hypercoagulable state such as system-wide bacterial infection, or pregnancy, though it is also sometimes seen in patients with venous catheters. NBTE may also occur in patients with cancer, particularly mucinous adenocarcinoma where Trousseau syndrome can be encountered. Typically, NBTE does not cause many problems on its own, but parts of the vegetations may break off and embolize to the heart or brain, or they may serve as a focus where bacteria can lodge, thus causing infective endocarditis.

Another form of sterile endocarditis is termed Libman–Sacks endocarditis; this form occurs more often in patients with lupus erythematosus and is thought to be due to the deposition of immune complexes. Like NBTE, Libman-Sacks endocarditis involves small vegetations, while infective endocarditis is composed of large vegetations. These immune complexes precipitate an inflammation reaction, which helps to differentiate it from NBTE. Also, unlike NBTE, Libman-Sacks endocarditis does not seem to have a preferred location of deposition and may form on the undersurfaces of the valves or even on the endocardium.
