= Emanuel Libman =

Jewish-American physician (1872–1946)

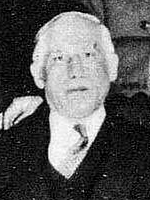
Libman in 1933

Emanuel Libman (August 22, 1872 – June 28, 1946) was a Jewish-American physician from New York City.

== Life ==
Libman was born on August 22, 1872, in New York City, New York, the son of Fajbush Libman and Hulda Spivak. His father was a picture frame dealer who owned a small store on the Lower East Side.

Libman graduated from the College of the City of New York with an A.B. in 1891 and from the Columbia University College of Physicians and Surgeons with an M.D. in 1894. He then worked as a home physician at Mount Sinai Hospital from 1894 to 1896. He did post-graduate work in Berlin, Vienna, Graz, Munich, and Prague from 1896 to 1897, returned to Berlin for further studies in 1903 and 1909, and studied at Johns Hopkins School of Medicine in 1906. He was influenced by Francis Delafield while attending Columbia and by Edward G. Janeway when he first joined Mount Sinai. He also came to know pediatricians Abraham Jacobi and Henry Koplik at Mount Sinai and initially considered working in pediatrics. While studying in Graz, he studied under Theodor Escherich in order to learn about infantile diarrhea from him. Within a few weeks in Escherich's laboratory, he discovered and described streptococcus enteritis, also known as streptococcus Libman. This led him to became a bacteriologist, although he also participated in routine pathology and post-mortem examinations.

Libman worked at Mount Sinai Hospital as an assistant pathologist from 1898 to 1903. He was promoted to associate visiting physician in 1903, attending physician in 1914, and consulting physician in 1925. He was also a consulting physician for the Association of Cardiac Clinics, the People's Hospital, Beth David Hospital, the National Hospital for Speech Defects, the Hospital for Deformities, and the Home of the Daughters of Jacob. During World War I, he was chairman of the Medical Advisory Board for the Selective Draft No. 13. He was appointed professor in clinical medicine at the Columbia University College of Physicians and Surgeons in 1909. He became president of the New York Pathological Society in 1908. He served as chairman of the executive committee of the American committee for the development of the medical department of the Hebrew University of Jerusalem. He wrote a number of articles for medical journals, and most of them were published in the three-volume Contributions to Medical to the Medical Sciences in 1932. He was on the cover of Time Magazine in 1935, and in 1939 The New Yorker wrote a profile on him.

Libman applied the research methods he learned abroad to study the bacteriology of the blood and perform autopsies to determine the cause of death. Much of his work was focused on endocarditis, and by the end of his career he became an unquestioned authority on the disease. In 1924, he and Benjamin Sacks isolated a new form of endocarditis they originally termed atypical verrucous endocarditis and was later known as Libman–Sacks endocarditis. He received a Silver Medal from the American Medical Association in 1942 for his work in discovering the disease. He was also known for his diagnostic skills, claiming to be able to diagnose patients with his sense of smell and predicting diseases strangers had by their appearance. He had a number of distinguished patients in his private practice, including Chaim Weizman and Albert Einstein, and he diagnosed Gustav Mahler with bacterial endocarditis shortly before Mahler's death in 1911. He was a founding member of the American Society for Clinical Investigations in 1908, and in 1931 he established the New York Academy of Medicine's "Graduate Fortnight" to encourage people to share their work. He helped establish a number of fellowships for medical research and education, including one at the Tuskegee University in Alabama, and during World War II he established the Henry Dazian Foundation for Medical Research to help Latin American doctors come to America. He also joined the Hadassah Medical Advisory Board in 1917. He never married.

Libman died at Mount Sinai Hospital from a week's illness on June 28, 1946. 300 people attended his funeral at the Free Synagogue. Rabbi Stephen S. Wise delivered the eulogy. The honorary pallbearers included Mount Sinai Hospital president George B. Bernheim, Beth Israel Hospital president David L. Podell, Montefiore Hospital president Henry L. Moses, Col. J. Hartfield, Emil Friedlander, Leo Bing, Albert Berg, David Nachmansohn, Harrison Stanford Martland, Israel Straus, and Otto Loewi.
