= Nonbacterial thrombotic endocarditis =

- Specialty: Cardiology
- Treatment: Anticoagulation

Nonbacterial thrombotic endocarditis (NBTE) is a form of endocarditis in which small sterile vegetations are deposited on the valve leaflets. Formerly known as marantic endocarditis, which comes from the Greek marantikos, meaning "wasting away". The term "marantic endocarditis" is still sometimes used to emphasize the association with a wasting state such as cancer.

== Risk factors ==
Marantic vegetations are often associated with previous rheumatic fever. Other risk factors include:

- hypercoagulable states
- malignant cancers, especially mucin-producing adenocarcinomas (most commonly associated with pancreatic adenocarcinomas)
- systemic lupus erythematosus: Referred to as Libman-Sacks endocarditis
- trauma (e.g., catheters)
- Antiphospholipid syndrome

=== Valve predilection ===
The disease affects the valves with following predilection: mitral valve > aortic valve > tricuspid valve > pulmonary valve

== Histopathology ==
Grossly, vegetations form along lines of valve closure and are generally symmetric with a smooth or verrucoid (warty) texture. Histologically, lesions are composed of fibrin (eosinophilic) and platelets but, unlike bacterial etiologies, contain little evidence of PMNs, microorganisms or inflammation.

== Diagnosis ==
Due to the non-invasive nature of NBTE, clinical examination may or may not reveal a new murmur. An embolic stroke may be the first feature to suggest diagnosis of NBTE. An echocardiogram is essential for visualization of the mass.
