= Osler's node =

Painful raised skin lesions of the hands and feet

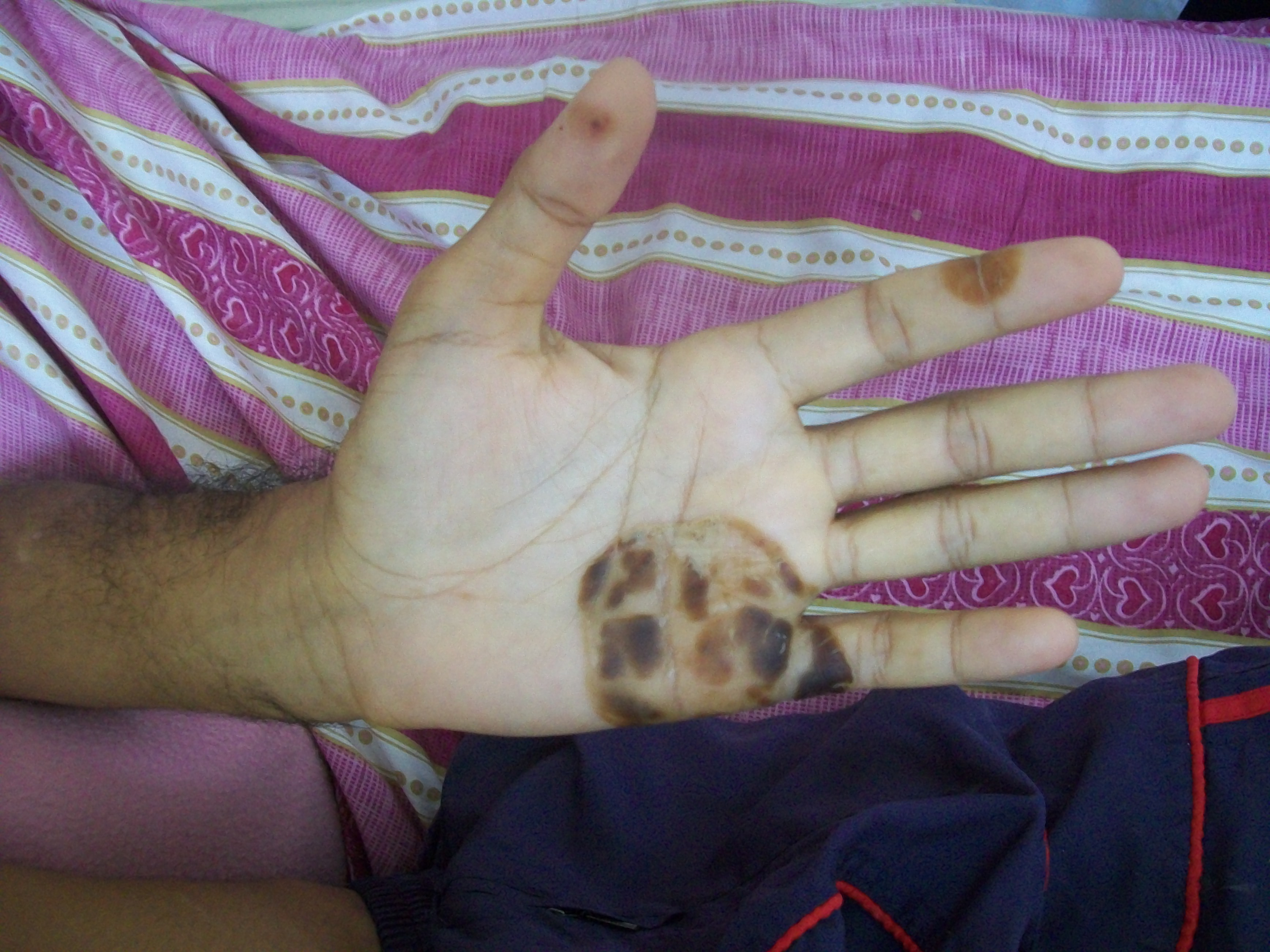
- Osler's lesions found on the hand and fingers of a 43-year-old male with subacute bacterial endocarditis
- Differential diagnosis: infective endocarditis

Osler's nodes are painful, red, raised lesions found typically on the hands and feet. They are associated with a number of conditions, including infective endocarditis, and are caused by immune complex deposition. Their presence is one definition of Osler's sign.

== Causes ==
Osler's nodes result from the deposition of immune complexes. The resulting inflammatory response leads to swelling, redness, and pain that characterize these lesions.

The nodes are commonly indicative of subacute bacterial endocarditis. 10–25% of endocarditis patients will have Osler's nodes. Other signs of endocarditis include Roth's spots and Janeway lesions. The latter, which also occur on the palms and soles, can be differentiated from Osler's nodes because they are non-tender.

Osler's nodes can also be seen in

- Systemic lupus erythematosus
- Marantic endocarditis
- Disseminated gonococcal infection
- Distal to infected arterial catheter

== Etymology ==
Osler's nodes are named after Sir William Osler who described them in the early twentieth century. He described them as "ephemeral spots of a painful nodular erythema, chiefly in the skin of the hands and feet."
