= Libman–Sacks endocarditis =

- Specialty: Rheumatology, Cardiology
- Symptoms: Nonbacterial thrombotic endocarditis, Marantic endocarditis, verrucous endocarditis
- Causes: Systemic lupus erythematosus, Malignancy, Antiphospholipid syndrome
- Diagnostic method: Echocardiography

Libman–Sacks endocarditis is a form of non-bacterial endocarditis that is seen in association with systemic lupus erythematosus, antiphospholipid syndrome, and malignancies. It is one of the most common cardiac manifestations of lupus (the most common being pericarditis).

== Presentation ==
Libman–Sacks endocarditis itself is typically asymptomatic. Affected persons most commonly present with embolisms secondary to dislodged vegetations. However, in some cases, severe valvular dysfunction may develop. People with systemic lupus erythematosus may present with other symptoms of the underlying diseases that give rise to Libman–Sacks endocarditis.

=== Complications ===
Libman–Sacks endocarditis may result in arterial emboli, valvular insufficiency, and heart failure. Infective endocarditis occurs more frequently with those with systemic lupus erythematosus.

==== Emboli ====
Vegetations occurring in the context of Libman–Sacks endocarditis may dislodge to form emboli and cause embolism (including cerebral embolism (presenting as stroke or transient ischaemic attack), mesenteric ischaemia (presenting with severe abdominal pain), or peripheral arterial embolism (presenting with limb coldness)).

== Causes ==
Libman–Sacks endocarditis occurs in association with systemic lupus erythematosus, antiphospholipid syndrome, and malignancies.

=== Systemic lupus erythematosus ===
In systemic lupus erythematosus, Libman–Sacks endocarditis has been linked to pericarditis, presence of anticardiolipin antibodies, arterial and venous thromboses, and neuropsychiatric manifestations of systemic lupus erythematosus. Libman–Sacks endocarditis is associated with greater systemic lupus erythematosus duration and severity. In some cases, Libman–Sacks endocarditis may be the presenting pathology in systemic lupus erythematosus, especially in the presence of concurrent antiphospholipid syndrome.

== Pathophysiology ==
The initial cause of Libman–Sacks endocarditis is poorly understood. It is thought to occur in the context of a hypercoagulable state which leads to endothelial injury and subsequent deposition of thrombi and inflammatory molecules in affected valves. The vegetations that are thus formed consist of immune complexes, platelet thrombi, fibrin, and mononuclear cells. The vegetations may dislodge and cause embolisms.

=== Histopathology ===
Libman–Sacks endocarditis involves formation of cardiac lesions that may take the form of vegetations or thickening of the valvular leaflets.

The vegetations are small and formed from strands of fibrin, neutrophils, lymphocytes, and histiocytes. Vegetations are most often small-to-moderate in size (up to 10 mm), but may sometimes be large (larger than 10 mm). The mitral valve is typically affected, and the vegetations occur on the ventricular and atrial surface of the valve. Though the left-sided heart valves (mitral and aortic) are most commonly affected, any heart valve as well as adjoining structures may become involved.

Libman–Sacks lesions rarely produce significant valve dysfunction and the lesions only rarely embolize. However, there is data to suggest an association between Libman–Sacks endocarditis and a higher risk for embolic cerebrovascular disease in people with systemic lupus erythematosus.

== Diagnosis ==
Libman–Sacks endocarditis should be considered in instances of thromboembolism in persons with underlying pathology that is associated with LSE. Libman–Sacks endocarditis is diagnosed with echocardiography. Other potential etiologies (e.g. infective endocarditis) should be excluded through an extensive assessment (complete blood count and metabolic panel, blood cultures). Libman–Sacks endocarditis can also be identified post-mortem during an autopsy.

=== Echocardiography ===
Echocardiography is considered the primary evaluation for Libman–Sacks endocarditis; transesophageal echocardiography has greater sensitivity and specificity than transthoracic echocardiography. In case of a negative TTE in the presence of clinical signs of Libman–Sacks endocarditis, transesophageal echocardiography may be attempted to confirm the presence of the condition.

Vegetations of the cardiac valves and endocardium are characterised by irregular borders, heterogenous echo density, and an absence of independent motion. Vegetations are usually small, but may be as large as 10mm. The basal and middle portions of the mitral and aortic valves are most commonly involved. Leaflet thickening or regurgitation may be present. There may be other cardiac pathology related to the underlying cause, e.g., lupus.

=== Differential diagnosis ===
Differential diagnoses include: rheumatic valvular disease, atrial myxoma, degenerative valvular disease, infective endocarditis, vasculitis, cholesterol emboli syndrome, fibroelastoma, and Lambl's excrescences.

== Management/treatment ==
The condition should be monitored to follow the development of the vegetations, and health personnel should be conscious of the potential risks associated with the condition.

There is a paucity of empirical evidence on treatment options for persons with Libman–Sacks endocarditis, and treatment should focus on the underlying cause. Anticoagulant treatment is recommended in cases with previous thromboembolic event for prevention of subsequent occurrences. Surgical intervention may be indicated in case of significant valvular dysfunction.

== Prognosis ==
Libman–Sacks endocarditis is often associated with considerable morbidity and mortality.

== Epidemiology ==
Libman–Sacks endocarditis has been observed in 0.2% in of the general population at autopsy. It occurs most commonly in those aged 40 to 80 years.

Libman–Sacks endocarditis vegetations are observed in 10% of systemic lupus erythematosus cases (however, in one study, vegetations were noted in 43% of systemic lupus erythematosus cases (0% in controls), and valvular thickening in 51% of systemic lupus erythematosus cases (7% in controls)). There is a significant correlation between systemic lupus erythematosus duration and severity, and the incidence of Libman–Sacks endocarditis. Libman–Sacks endocarditis has been identified in 1.25% of those with malignant disease at autopsy.

== History ==
It was first described by Emanuel Libman and Benjamin Sacks at Mount Sinai Hospital in New York City in 1924. The association between Libman–Sacks endocarditis and antiphospholipid syndrome was first noted in 1985.
