= Janeway lesion =

Small red lesions of the hands and feet

- Specialty: Cardiology; Dermatology
- Symptoms: Painless red flat papules on palms and soles
- Usual onset: Sudden
- Duration: Days to weeks
- Causes: Infective endocarditis
- Diagnostic method: Appearance
- Differential diagnosis: Osler's nodes

Janeway lesions are rare, non-tender, small erythematous or haemorrhagic macular, papular or nodular lesions on the palms or soles only a few millimeters in diameter that are associated with infective endocarditis and often indistinguishable from Osler's nodes.

== Definition ==
Janeway lesions are painless, frequently haemorrhagic lesions seen most commonly on the palms and soles, particularly on the base of the thumb and little finger, and seen in infective endocarditis.

== Differential ==
Osler's nodes and Janeway lesions are similar and point to the same diagnostic conclusion. The most significant difference between the two is that Osler's nodes present with tenderness, while Janeway lesions do not. Osler's nodes are thought to be due to immunologic phenomenon where deposition of immune complexes provoke inflammatory response, leading to swelling, redness and pain. On the contrary, Janeway lesions are thought to be due to embolic phenomenon in cutaneous blood vessels of palms and soles which does not cause pain or least pain.

== Pathophysiology ==
Pathologically, the lesion is described to be a microabscess of the dermis with marked necrosis and inflammatory infiltrate not involving the epidermis.

They are caused by septic emboli which deposit bacteria, forming microabscesses. Organisms may be cultured from the lesions.

== Diagnosis ==
Janeway lesions present as red, painless macules and papules on the palms and soles.

They are not common and are frequently indistinguishable from Osler's nodes. Rarely, they have been reported in cases of systemic lupus erythematosis (SLE), gonococcemia (disseminated gonorrhoea), haemolytic anaemia and typhoid fever.

They may last days to weeks before completely resolving.

== History ==
Janeway lesions are named after Edward Janeway (1841–1911), a prominent American physician, pathologist and contemporary of Sir William Osler, who initially described "peculiar skin lesions" in some people with endocarditis, in a paper published in 1899. The term was first used by internist and pathologist Emanuel Libman, who reported the lesions in his paper of 1906 and explained his reasoning for using the term "Janeway lesions" in a footnote in 1923. Osler never mentioned Janeway lesions. The inclusion into Osler's 1925 textbook came six years after Osler died.

== See also ==
- Roth's spots
