= Splinter hemorrhage =

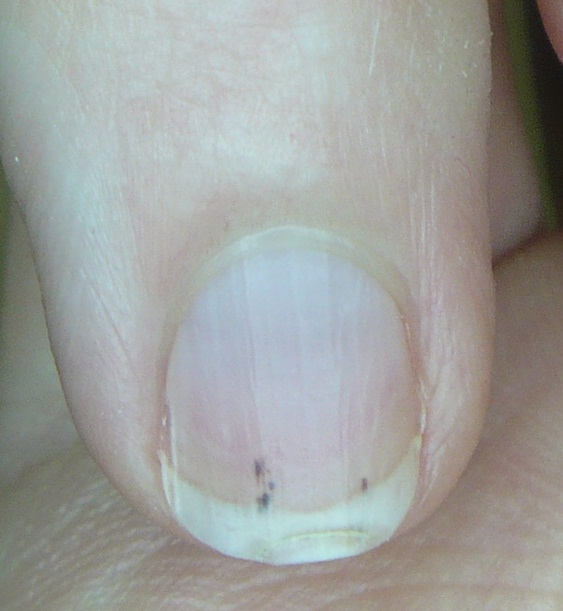
- Splinter hemorrhage on a fingernail of the little finger
- Differential diagnosis: subacute infective endocarditis, scleroderma, trichinosis, systemic lupus erythematosus (SLE), rheumatoid arthritis, psoriatic nails, antiphospholipid syndrome

Splinter hemorrhages (or haemorrhages) are tiny blood clots that tend to run vertically under the nails. Splinter hemorrhages are not specific to any particular condition, and can be associated with subacute infective endocarditis, scleroderma, trichinosis, systemic lupus erythematosus (SLE), rheumatoid arthritis, psoriatic nails, antiphospholipid syndrome, haematological malignancy, and trauma. At first they are usually plum-colored, but then darken to brown or black in a couple of days. In certain conditions (in particular, infective endocarditis), clots can migrate from the affected heart valve and find their way into various parts of the body. If this happens in the finger, it can cause damage to the capillaries resulting in a splinter hemorrhage.

There are a number of other causes for splinter hemorrhages. They could be due to hitting the nail (trauma), a sign of inflammation in blood vessels all around the body (systemic vasculitis), or they could be where a fragment of cholesterol has become lodged in the capillaries of the finger. Even if a patient does have infective endocarditis, roughly 1 in 10 patients have splinter hemorrhages.

== Additional image ==
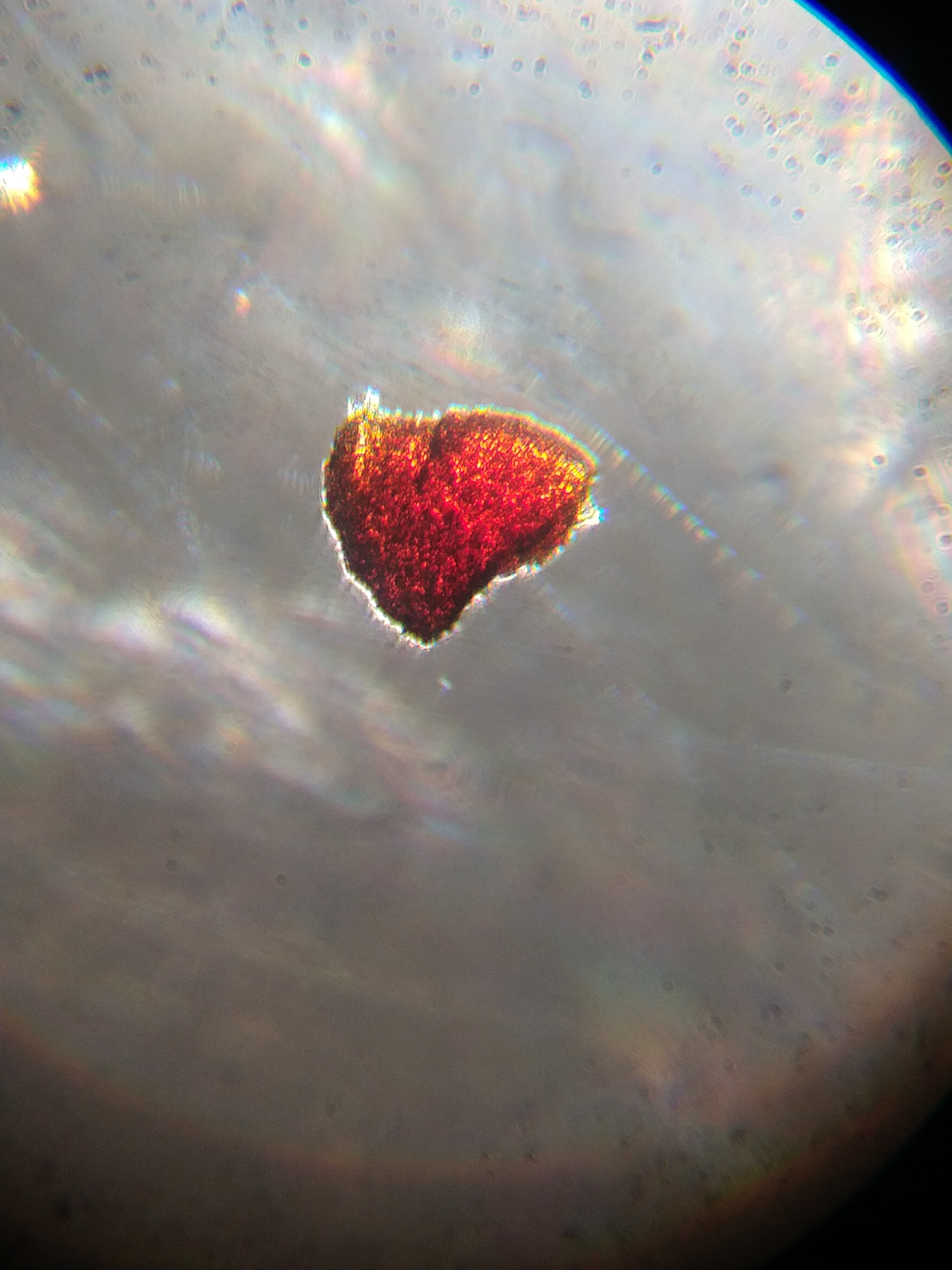
Splinter hemorrhage under the microscope

== See also ==
- Skin lesion
- List of cutaneous conditions
