= Roth's spot =

Red lesion on the retina of the eye

- Other names: Litten sign
- Specialty: Ophthalmology
- Causes: Conditions that predispose to endothelial damage of retinal capillaries
- Diagnostic method: Fundoscopy

Roth's spots, also known as Litten spots or the Litten sign, are non-specific red lesions with white or pale centres, seen on the retina of the eye and although traditionally associated with infective endocarditis, can occur in a number of other conditions including hypertension, diabetes mellitus, collagen vascular disease, extreme hypoxia, leukemia and HIV.

Red and white retinal spots were first observed in 1872 by Swiss physician Moritz Roth, and named "Roth spots" six years later by Moritz Litten. They are typically observed via fundoscopy (using an ophthalmoscope to view inside the eye) or slit lamp exam.

The original retinal spots identified in 1872 were attributed to nerve-fibres that had burst. Present-day analysis shows that they can be composed of coagulated fibrin including platelets, focal ischaemia, inflammatory infiltrate, infectious organisms, or neoplastic cells.

== Presentation ==
=== Associated conditions ===
Conditions associated with Roth's spots include:

- Infective endocarditis
- Anaemia/thrombocytopenia
- Collagen vascular disease
- Leukemia
- Hypertensive retinopathy
- Diabetic retinopathy
- Pre-eclampsia
- Human Immunodeficiency Virus (HIV)
- Extreme hypoxia
- Shaken-baby syndrome

and also:

- Candida albicans infection
- vascular diseases
- kala azar

== Cause ==
Roth's spots occur in conditions that predispose to endothelial damage of retinal capillaries, that is when there is dysfunction and disruption of the endothelium of retinal capillaries. Looking through the microscope reveals lesions with white centers made mainly of fibrin, depicting a fibrin-platelet plug at the site of vessel damage.

== Prevalence ==
Roth's spots occur in only 5% of people with infective endocarditis. Litten, however reported a figure of 80%.

== See also ==
- Osler's nodes
- Janeway lesion
- Splinter haemorrhage
