= Regurgitation (circulation) =

Type of blood flow

Regurgitation is blood flow in the opposite direction from normal, as the backward flowing of blood into the heart or between heart chambers. It is the circulatory equivalent of backflow in engineered systems. It is sometimes called reflux.

== Types of heart valve regurgitation ==
The various types of heart valve regurgitation via insufficiency are as follows:

1. Aortic regurgitation: the backflow of blood from the aorta into the left ventricle, owing to insufficiency of the aortic semilunar valve; it may be chronic or acute.
2. Mitral regurgitation: the backflow of blood from the left ventricle into the left atrium, owing to insufficiency of the mitral valve; it may be acute or chronic, and is usually due to mitral valve prolapse, rheumatic heart disease, or a complication of cardiac dilatation. See also Mitral regurgitation.
3. Pulmonic regurgitation: the backflow of blood from the pulmonary artery into the right ventricle, owing to insufficiency of the pulmonic semilunar valve.
4. Tricuspid regurgitation: the backflow of blood from the right ventricle into the right atrium, owing to imperfect functioning (insufficiency) of the tricuspid valve.

Regurgitation in or near the heart is often caused by valvular insufficiency (insufficient function, with incomplete closure, of the heart valves); for example, aortic valve insufficiency causes regurgitation through that valve, called aortic regurgitation, and the terms aortic insufficiency and aortic regurgitation are so closely linked as usually to be treated as metonymically interchangeable.

== Regurgitant fraction ==
Regurgitant fraction is the percentage of blood that regurgitates back through the aortic valve to the left ventricle due to aortic insufficiency, or through the mitral valve to the atrium due to mitral insufficiency. It is measured as the amount of blood regurgitated into a cardiac chamber divided by the stroke volume.

This fraction affords a quantitative measure of the severity of the valvular lesion. Normally, no blood regurgitates, so the regurgitant fraction is zero. In patients with severe valvular lesions, regurgitant fraction can approach 80%.

== Epidemiology ==
=== Tricuspid and mitral regurgitation ===
Tricuspid regurgitation is common and is estimated to occur in 65–85% of the population. In The Framingham Heart Study presence of any severity of tricuspid regurgitation, ranging from trace to above moderate was in 82% of men and in 85.7% of women. Mild tricuspid regurgitation tend to be common and benign and in structurally normal tricuspid valve apparatus can be considered a normal variant. Moderate or severe tricuspid regurgitation is usually associated with tricuspid valve leaflet abnormalities and/or possibly annular dilation and is usually pathologic which can lead to irreversible damage of cardiac muscle and worse outcomes due to chronic prolonged right ventricular volume overload.

In a study of 595 male elite football players aged 18–38, and 47 sedentary non-athletes, it was found that 58% of the athletes had tricuspid regurgitation vs. 36% in non-athletes and mitral regurgitation was found in 20% football players and 15% in controls. Football players with tricuspid regurgitation had larger tricuspid annulus diameter, compared to athletes without tricuspid regurgitation. Athletes with tricuspid regurgitation also had enlarged right atrium diameter when compared to control group. In athletes with mitral regurgitation it was found they had larger mitral annulus diameter, compared to athletes without regurgitation. Also left atrium diameter was larger in athletes with mitral regurgitation.

== See also ==
- Stenosis
- Valvular heart disease
