= Gilles Dreyfus =

French cardiac surgeon

- Born: May 24, 1951
- Education: Paris Faculty of Medicine, Hôpitaux de Paris
- Scientific career
- Fields: Cardiac surgery
- Workplaces: Cardio-thoracic center of Monaco
- Academic advisors: Alain Carpentier, Norman E. Shumway

Gilles Dreyfus (born 24 May 1951) is a French cardiac surgeon specializing in mitral valve repair, heart transplantation, and cardiac assist devices. He is Senior Staff Surgeon and Professor at Hôpital Européen Georges-Pompidou in Paris and is affiliated with Paris Cité University. Over the course of his career, Dreyfus held positions at the Broussais Hospital, the Foch Hospital, and the Harefield Hospital in London, where he served as director of cardio-thoracic surgery and transplantation. In 2010, he was appointed Medical Director of the Cardio-thoracic center of Monaco. He was nominated Professor of Cardiovascular Surgery in 1989 and later Professor of cardio-thoracic surgery at Imperial College School of Medicine.

He has received the Lifetime Achievement Award presented by the American Association for Thoracic Surgery (AATS) in 2025. He was appointed Chevalier de la Légion d'honneur by the French government in 2001 and Order de Saint-Charles by the Principality of Monaco in 2012.

His research contributions include the first mitral valve repair in acute endocarditis, the development of the total heart transplant technique, and a 2003 study on tricuspid annulus dilation that influenced the guidelines of the American College of Cardiology, American Heart Association, and European Society of Cardiology. He was made a Knight of the Légion d'honneur in 2001.

== Education ==
Dreyfus graduated from the Medical Faculty of Paris (Paris V, CHU Broussais – Hotel Dieu). From 1978 to 1983 he was Resident in cardiac surgery at the Hôpitaux de Paris, where he was trained in adult and congenital cardiac surgery guided by Binet, Dubost, Guilmet and Neveux.

From October 1983 to 1987, he was the Chef de Clinique for Alain Carpentier, senior resident and staff surgeon at the Broussais Hospital. From 1987 to 1989, he was Consultant surgeon of the Hôpitaux de Paris, working with Carpentier. In 1983, he trained for 6 months at the University of Stanford to specialize in heart and lung transplantation with N.Shumway. Back in Paris, he started a transplant program at the Broussais Hospital, in the department headed by Carpentier.

== Career ==
=== Broussais Hospital, 1983-1989 ===
Dreyfus started as senior resident/assistant surgeon, before becoming staff surgeon of Carpentier. He acquired a specific training in mitral valve repair and developed new surgical techniques in valve repair with Carpentier, in particular he performed the first mitral valve repair in case of acute endocarditis and he published an article on innovative surgical procedures. He also improved the transplant program at the Broussais Hospital, started by Dubost and discontinued after 4 patients. The program developed rapidly: from 1984 to 1989, more than 200 heart transplants were performed at the Broussais Hospital. An artificial heart project as a bridge to transplant was also developed.

In 1986, he helped Carpentier perform the first artificial heart implant in Europe. During his stay at the Broussais Hospital, Gilles Dreyfus published several articles on heart transplant, such as Total orthotopic heart transplant: an alternative to the standard technique (Annals of Thoracic Surgery 1991), where he described a new technique called total heart transplant. He was nominated Professor of Cardiovascular Surgery in 1989 by Alain Carpentier.

=== Foch Hospital, 1989-2001 ===
In November 1989, Gilles Dreyfus became staff surgeon of Daniel Guilmet at the Foch Hospital and Professor of Cardiovascular surgery. He performed more than 500 mitral valve repairs and described new repair techniques such as the papillary muscle repositioning for anterior leaflet and posterior commissural prolapse. He also improved the heart transplant program, from 10 to 25 cases per year, so that the Foch Hospital became the 2nd-3rd most active center in the region of Île-de-France.

Gilles Dreyfus continued the research on artificial hearts as a bridge to transplant, implanting TCI and NOVACOR for the first time in France. In 1998, after Guilmet’s retirement, Gilles Dreyfus became chief of cardiac and vascular surgery of the Foch Hospital, continuing the surgical activity and developing the heart valve repair surgery, the ventricular assist devices and heart transplant programs.

In 2000, French actor Gérard Depardieu underwent coronary artery bypass surgery performed by Dreyfus.

=== London : Royal Brompton and Harefield, NHS Trust, 2001-2009 ===
In April 2001, Gilles Dreyfus joined Magdi Yacoub at the Harefield Hospital in London, UK. They worked together for 6 months before Dreyfus became director of the cardio-thoracic surgery in October 2001, following Yacoub’s retirement. He was nominated Professor of cardio-thoracic surgery at the Imperial College School of Medicine (2nd University of UK) and then became director of the cardio-thoracic surgery and transplantation at the Harefield Hospital. He also continued his research on mitral valve surgery and on tricuspid valve.

In 2003, he presented a research paper at the AATS annual meeting with a study population of 311 patients, divided into two subgroups: one underwent isolated mitral valve repair, the other mitral valve repair associated with tricuspid valve repair. In this research, professor Dreyfus demonstrated the rationale in treating the tricuspid annulus dilation independently from the presence of tricuspid regurgitation. This principle influenced the guidelines of the international societies of Cardiology, may it be the American College of Cardiology / American Heart Association, or the European Society of Cardiology.

He also focused his research on a new technique to replace the aortic valve, using autologous pericardium. Results of this method, called Cardiomend were presented at the American Society of Thoracic Surgeons annual meeting in 2001 and were the object of two articles.

As Director of one of the largest centers for transplantation in Europe, he led a program of heart and lung transplant and cardiac assist devices. Under his influence, the Harefield group was the first group in Europe to implant the Jarvik 2000, in addition to other assist devices as destination therapy or as bridge-to-recovery in case of heart failure.

While practicing in London, he operated the Queen of Spain's brother, the Queen of England's cousin, the King Constantin of Greece.

In 2002, professor Dreyfus, along with three other famous European surgeons specialized in mitral valve repair, developed the Master of Valve Repair, a training course supported by Edwards Lifesciences, happening twice or thrice a year, where more than 2000 European surgeons have been trained to advanced techniques in mitral valve repair.

=== Cardio-Thoracic Centre in Monaco ===
In January 2010, upon the request of Vincent Dor, Gilles Dreyfus was appointed as Medical Director or the Cardio-Thoracic Centre in Monaco, taking over Dor who retired.

During his tenure at the Cardiothoracic Centre of Monaco, he performed more than 1,000 mitral valve repairs and contributed to advances in mitral valve surgery and mechanical circulatory support. In 2006, he published a technique for mitral valve repair in the Journal of Heart Valve Disease that was later referred to by other surgeons as the "haircut technique". He also authored the article "Respect: When You Can Resect, When You Should", published in The Journal of Thoracic and Cardiovascular Surgery, which examined surgical approaches to posterior mitral leaflet repair and has remained an influential contribution to the continuing debate over resection versus leaflet preservation in mitral valve surgery. At the Cardiothoracic Centre, he was among the first surgeons in Europe to perform robotic-assisted cardiac surgery using the da Vinci Xi surgical system, completing approximately 200 robotic procedures. He also established a destination therapy programme for patients with advanced heart failure in a region without a heart transplant programme, implanting the Jarvik 2000 left ventricular assist device using a skull-mounted percutaneous power connector.

Dreyfus is also active in surgical education and international collaboration. He is a regular invited speaker at major cardiovascular conferences, including the annual Transcatheter Cardiovascular Therapeutics (TCT) meeting. For more than a decade, he has conducted live surgical demonstrations and provided specialist training at leading cardiac centres across mainland China. He also collaborates with the Sri Jayadeva Institute of Cardiovascular Sciences and Research in Bengaluru, India, where he contributes to the training of cardiac surgeons and the development of advanced heart valve surgery.

== Humanitarian work ==
Alongside his clinical and academic career, Dreyfus has participated in humanitarian cardiac surgery initiatives in several countries, including Vietnam and Mozambique, where he has contributed to the treatment of patients and the training of local medical teams. A major focus of his humanitarian work has been in Senegal. Dreyfus played a leading role in the establishment of the Centre Cardio-Pédiatrique Cuomo (CCPC) at the Fann National University Hospital in Dakar, the first public cardiac surgery centre in West Africa capable of performing open-heart surgery for children. Developed in partnership with the Government of Senegal, the Fann National University Hospital, the French humanitarian organization La Chaîne de l'Espoir, and the Cuomo Foundation, the project included the financing of the centre's construction and equipment, together with the long-term training of Senegalese surgeons, anaesthetists, nurses, and perfusionists.

Since the centre began performing operations in 2017, it has become a regional referral facility for children with congenital and rheumatic heart disease from Senegal and neighbouring West African countries. By 2023, the centre had completed more than 1,000 open-heart operations, and subsequent reports indicate that the total has exceeded 1,500 procedures. Dreyfus has continued to support the programme through surgical missions, specialist training, and educational initiatives aimed at developing a self-sustaining local cardiac surgery service.

== Research and scholarship ==
Dreyfus's research has focused primarily on cardiac valve surgery, particularly mitral and tricuspid valve disease, heart transplantation, and reconstructive cardiac surgery. Over a career spanning more than four decades, he has contributed to the evolution of modern valve repair by combining clinical research with surgical innovation, emphasizing valve preservation, improved long-term outcomes, and individualized treatment strategies. His work has influenced international clinical guidelines and contemporary surgical practice, especially regarding the management of functional tricuspid regurgitation and complex mitral valve disease.

Dreyfus has authored more than 300 peer-reviewed publications, numerous book chapters, and invited reviews in cardiothoracic surgery. His research has been published in leading journals including The Journal of Thoracic and Cardiovascular Surgery, The Annals of Thoracic Surgery, European Journal of Cardio-Thoracic Surgery, Circulation, European Heart Journal, Journal of the American College of Cardiology, and European Journal of Echocardiography. Through his clinical investigations, he has sought to bridge advances in cardiac imaging, surgical technique, and long-term patient outcomes.

=== Mitral valve repair ===
Mitral valve repair has been the principal focus of Dreyfus's academic career. Building on the reconstructive philosophy pioneered by Alain Carpentier, he became an advocate for valve repair rather than valve replacement whenever anatomically feasible. His work examined both degenerative and functional mitral valve disease, with particular emphasis on mitral valve repair techniques that optimize a durable leaflet coaptation line and preserve left ventricular function. His approach emphasized achieving a broad coaptation height between the A2 and P2 scallops rather than simply restoring normal mitral valve anatomy.

Dreyfus studied the long-term durability of mitral valve repair, recurrent regurgitation, and surgical techniques for complex valve abnormalities. His work examined leaflet reconstruction, annuloplasty, chordal repair, minimally invasive surgery, and intraoperative echocardiography. He also collaborated with cardiologists and echocardiographers to improve preoperative assessment and guide surgical planning.

=== Tricuspid valve surgery ===
Among Dreyfus's contributions has been his work on tricuspid valve disease. During much of the twentieth century, functional tricuspid regurgitation was frequently regarded as a secondary consequence of left-sided heart disease and often remained untreated during cardiac surgery.

Beginning in the late 1990s, Dreyfus investigated the progression of tricuspid regurgitation after left-sided valve surgery. He proposed using tricuspid annular dilatation, rather than regurgitation severity alone, to guide surgical intervention. His clinical studies examined the outcomes of concomitant tricuspid annuloplasty and its effects on right ventricular function and recurrent regurgitation. This work contributed to the incorporation of annular dilatation into international guidelines for tricuspid valve repair.

=== Valve reconstruction and surgical innovation ===
Dreyfus has advocated valve repair over replacement when technically feasible, emphasizing preservation of native valve anatomy and ventricular function. His research has examined annuloplasty rings, artificial chordae, leaflet reconstruction, and papillary muscle techniques. He has also studied minimally invasive valve surgery and the use of three-dimensional echocardiography in surgical planning, highlighting the role of multidisciplinary collaboration in improving outcomes.

=== Heart transplantation and advanced cardiac surgery ===
Dreyfus has worked in heart transplantation and the surgical management of advanced heart failure, including the use of ventricular assist devices (VADs) as bridges to transplantation. At Broussais Hospital in Paris, he participated in early bridge-to-transplant procedures using the Thoratec BiVAD and Abiomed BVS 5000. At Foch Hospital and Harefield Hospital in the United Kingdom, he worked with implantable devices including the HeartMate I, Novacor, Jarvik 2000 and HeartMate II. His experience also includes the implantation of newer-generation mechanical circulatory support systems and more than 400 heart transplantations.

=== Cardiac imaging and multidisciplinary care ===
Dreyfus has collaborated with cardiac imaging specialists to investigate valve morphology, ventricular remodeling, and valvular dysfunction. His research examined the use of preoperative and intraoperative echocardiography to guide valve repair and assess its durability. He has also studied quantitative valve assessment and right ventricular function, contributing to multidisciplinary approaches to cardiac surgical planning and postoperative evaluation.

== Awards and honours ==
- Lifetime Achievement Award, presented by the American Association for Thoracic Surgery (AATS) 2025.
- Chevalier de la Légion d'honneur by the French government in 2001
- Order de Saint-Charles by the Principality of Monaco in 2012
