= JACC: Cardiovascular Imaging =

- Discipline: Cardiology
- Language: English
- Edited by: YS Chandrashekhar

Publication details
- History: 2008–present
- Publisher: Elsevier for the American College of Cardiology
- Frequency: Weekly
- Impact factor: 16.051 (2021)

Standard abbreviations
- ISO 4: JACC: Cardiovasc. Imaging
- NLM: JACC Cardiovasc Imaging

Indexing
- ISSN: 1936-878X (print); 1876-7591 (web)

Links
- Journal homepage; Journal page on publisher's website

JACC: Cardiovascular Imaging is a peer-reviewed scientific journal published by Elsevier for the American College of Cardiology since 2008. It currently has the highest impact factor among journals with a focus on cardiovascular imaging and it publishes original articles ranging from clinical studies to translational and basic research on novel imaging modalities with potential for future clinical usage. It is indexed by MEDLINE and on PubMed.

== Associated journals ==
- Journal of the American College of Cardiology
- JACC: Cardiovascular Interventions

== See also ==
- European Heart Journal
