= Jozef Cywinski =

Polish bioengineer (born 1936)

- Born: 13 March 1936 (age 90); Warsaw, Poland
- Education: Warsaw University of Technology Politechnika Warszawska
- Known for: Development of medical devices (pacemakers, Veinoplus…)
- Awards: Senior Member of the IEEE; Fellow of the American College of Cardiology; International Certificate in Clinical Engineering by the AAMI
- Scientific career
- Fields: Biomedical engineering, Medical electronics, computer science
- Workplaces: Politechnika Warszawska, University of Pennsylvania, University of Missouri, Harvard Medical, Massachusetts General Hospital, Massachusetts Institute of Technology, Valmed-SA, Institute of Medical Technology

Jozef Cywinski (Polish: Józef Cywiński; born 13 March 1936) is a Polish-American scientist, a specialist in the field of biomedical engineering and specifically in electrical stimulation of living organisms. His work has been the subject of 12 patents, two books and over 100 scientific publications. He developed several first-on-the-market electro-medical devices like cardiac stimulators pacemakers, train-of-four nerve stimulators, PACS, EMS, TENS and Veinoplus calf pump stimulators.

== Biography ==
=== Early life and education ===
Jozef Cywinski was born in pre-war Warsaw, Poland in 1936. During World War II his family was heavily involved with the underground fighting against the Nazis. Because his family is part of a noble Polish family (using the Puchala coat of arms), the Cywinski family lost their residence and resources in Warsaw and moved to the small city of Bielsko in a mountainous region in the south of Poland. Circumstances like these were common with disastrous effects on millions of Poles. Cywinski, like many others did not receive the typical education most students would receive in school during peaceful times. In 1945, several displaced professors from Lviv and Vilnius Universities settled in Bielsko too, creating an accelerated and highly sophisticated climate in which to learn. They taught Cywinski physics, chemistry and math personally, while he attended the Liceum im. Kopernika. There, he was awarded a Leader in Science and Social Work certificate. Graduating from high school, he won the concourse for admission to the Telecommunications Program at the Warsaw Polytech [Politechnika Warszawska]. At the age of 16 he was one of the youngest students ever admitted there.

==== Graduate work, 1955–1960 ====
Three years later, in 1955, Cywinski enrolled in a newly created graduate program in Medical Electronics, which was a joint venture between the University of Warsaw Medical School (Akademia Medyczna) and the Warsaw Poytech. Here, Cywinski constructed his first invention: a linear-motor automatic scanner for chromatography of blood samples. The analyzer was the first of its kind and type developed at these times in Poland.

This instrument was also essential for the graduate diploma work and discovery of light and heavy fractions of myosine (muscle cell proteins) of Cywinski's wife, Hanna Zawistowska, a biochemist herself. Cywinski worked as a full-time engineer in the Laboratory of Applied Physics at the Warsaw Pol where he constructed vacuum-tube electrometers. It was thanks to the use of Cywinski's electrometers that the first European semiconductor-charge copying machine was developed. Later, in 1959 he worked at the Laboratory of Computer Science of the Warsaw University of Technology where he built vacuum-tube registers for the first Polish-made computer.

In 1960, Cywinski received a Master of Science degree in Medical Engineering.

==== Postgraduate work, 1960–1967 ====
For Cywinski's doctorate degree, which began in 1962, he continued the joint endeavor with the Medical University of Warsaw and the Warsaw University of Technology. During this time he became the director of the Electronics Laboratory at the Institute of Cardiology, at the Medical University of Warsaw. He wrote papers on the electro-stimulation of heart and a doctorate thesis on automatic analysis radio chromatograms of blood.

At the Cardiology Institute, Cywinski created the world's first P-wave controlled external cardiac pacemaker and a new technique for ECG recording. The animal research on this pacemaker was completed in 1964 and Cywinski submitted the project to be presented at the World Congress of Bioengineering in Tokyo, Japan. He was invited to present his paper on P-wave pacemakers in September, 1965 at the plenary session of the Congress. Cywinski was extended an invitation to join the artificial heart program under Professor Leslie Peterson M.D. at the University of Pennsylvania pending the completion of his doctorate studies in Poland.

In 1967, he demonstrated his own construction of a working prototype of a Digital Radiochromatograph. A first of its kind, it computed in binary code fractional ratios of blood proteins. He publicly defended his thesis in front of the joint faculty of the Medical University of Warsaw and the Warsaw University of Technology and received a Doctor in Science (Bioengineering) degree (Ph.D./D.Sc.) from the latter.

=== Professional career ===
==== Poland, 1960–1967 ====
While studying at Warsaw University of Technology, Cywinski co-founded and was partner and R&D Director of the industrial laboratory Ridan Instruments Ltd., where he developed, patented and manufactured Poland's first muscle electro-stimulators (Diadynamic), blood-gas analysers, potentiometric pHmeters and charge-electrometers for diagnostic purposes.

==== France, 1967 ====
Cywinski spent six months in Paris, France waiting for immigration papers to the United States. During this time, Cywinski completed two projects. Firstly, with Professor Renaud Koechlin, at Hopital Foch in Suresnes, Paris, he developed the first satellite transmission interface device for tele-diagnosis of vectorcardiograms. Telediagnosis was made between the University of Tours, France and Washington University in St. Louis, Missouri, in the United States via satellite and on-line communication with computer systems. He was asked to demonstrate his work to General Charles de Gaulle and members of the French government. He was then asked to join the Electronique Appliquée Laboratoire (ELA) in Montrouge, France. There he developed the first European prototype of an implantable on-demand cardiac pacemaker. The prototype was implanted in Paris in October 1967 for the first time by dr. Mugica at Pitié-Salpêtrière Hospital, during a midnight emergency intervention. Despite the lack of animal trials, the pacemaker saved the patient's life and allowed him to live for several more years. Today, Cywinski-type on-demand pacers are still manufactured by the ELA-SORIN factory and widely used throughout the world.

==== United States, 1967–1993 ====
In 1967, Cywinski began work on the NIH-sponsored Artificial Heart Project. After only two years and with a team of two surgeons Waldemar J. Wajszczuk M.D. and Ahmed Kutty, M.D., Cywinski developed and published an analog computer model of the physiologic rate and contractility controls for artificial hearts. However, NIH sponsored work did not continue past this point and artificial heart research shifted to private industry.

In 1970, Cywinski accepted a teaching offer as an associate professor of radiology and an associate professor of electrical engineering from the University of Missouri Medical School in Columbia Missouri. He developed and taught a course regarding electro-medical devices for diagnosis and therapy. Additionally, he collaborated with Allan Hahn in the animal laboratory facility developing implantable fuel cells.

A year later, he was invited to join the faculty of Harvard Medical School as a principal associate in anesthesia and bioengineering. Simultaneously, he was invited to join the faculty of a newly created program combining the medical curriculum of Harvard Medical School with the graduate program of electrical engineering at the Massachusetts Institute of Technology (MIT). He developed a new graduate-level course (HST-510) in medical engineering. For students, this was a five-year program that included medical school, medical engineering lectures and laboratory work. This program was carried out at Massachusetts General Hospital (MGH) in Boston. There, in 1974, Cywinski created the first Department of Medical Engineering in the U.S. as well as taking on the position of director. His activities included planning, development, purchase and service of patient monitoring systems in this 2000-bed hospital.

In his MGH lab he developed electrical devices and methods for train-of-four stimulation of depth of anaesthesia monitoring, as well the stimulators for pain research and for bone fracture healing.

Concurrently, Cywinski's personal research revolved around applications and safety of electrical stimulation. His animal research together with Cardiologist and Professor Paul Zoll at Beth Israel Hospital in Boston has become the basis for the globally accepted Standard for Transcutaneous Electo-Stimulation undersigned by the US National Bureau of Standards (ANBS), AAMI and recognized by the Food and Drug Administration (FDA) of the United States.

Cywinski invented and produced devices such as the "train-of-four" method for patient monitoring of depth of muscle relaxation during anesthesia as well as implantable stimulators for brain research and bone fracture healing.

While at MGH/MIT, Cywinski developed bio-galvanic implantable cardiac stimulators. In 3- to 5-year tests performed by Professor Allan Hahn and his team at the Animal Research Center of the University of Missouri, the bio-galvanic pacemakers implanted in dogs functioned well with a projected lifespan of over 50 years. This was in the early 1970s when the industry-wide standard was to use mercury batteries in implantable cardiac pacemakers, which lasted only two years. At the same time, the leading manufacturer of pacemakers heavily invested in the development of nuclear batteries with similar projected life spans of 50–80 years. They were quickly abandoned due to nuclear waste handling problems. Cywinski's bio-galvanic pacemakers were not adopted by the industry, either. In the end, all implantable power sources were narrowed down to lithium cells which then became the industry standard.

In 1978, for his pioneering work in the field of cardiac pacing and bio-galvanic batteries, Cywinski was nominated as Fellow of the American College of Cardiology.

In 1983 during his summer sabbatical leave from Harvard he did joint research with Professor Geoffery Kidd at the Sherrington Laboratory at the University of Liverpool, UK. This joint effort led to many publications and a joint patent on stimulators using Motor Unit Action Potential (MUAP) patterns for neuromuscular stimulation. Additionally, during his time in Boston, he served as a Federal Court-appointed expert in patent litigations between the major manufacturers of cardiac pacemakers.

Most of Cywinski's career was in academia, but in 1986 he voluntarily retired from MGH-Harvard-MIT and created a business around one of his inventions for the medical imaging field. Cywinski co-founded Medinet, Inc. in New York. There, with the able help of his son (MIT graduate) L. Mark Cywinski, he developed the world's first computerized medical picture archiving and communication system (PACS) and imaging workstations for Doppler ultrasound scanners.

Cywinski then started Corsan Engineering Consulting Co. Inc., a consulting agency for medical technologies in Duxbury, MA and Rockville Centre, NY. The sample list of clients includes Agfa-Matrix, Bio-Medical Research Ltd, Du Pont, IBM-Medical, Med. & Biol. Instruments Inc., Philips-Medical, Siemens-Medical, Sony-Medical, and Vitatron N.V.

Simultaneously, in Warsaw, Poland he co-founded in partnership with the Polish American Enterprise Fund (PAEF) and Warsaw Technical University, another company called Secura, Ltd, which developed and marketed ultrafiltration devices for medical, industrial and environmental projects.

==== Switzerland, 1994–2007 ====
In 1994, the Swiss Federation president, Mr. Schmidthalter, asked Cywinski to come to Switzerland and build a medical device business in Sion using the building that had originally been used for Switzerland's artificial heart program. Cywinski took over the building and constructed two ventures; Valmed Ltd and the R&D Institute of Medical Technology (ITM). At Valmed Ltd, Cywinski, as CEO and managing director developed and manufactured neuromuscular stimulators for physiotherapy and sports medicine. The Institute of Medical Technology was a non-profit foundation for R&D in new medical technologies. Within ITM he continued lecturing, conferences and publishing research in the field of neuromuscular stimulation with a particular focus on improvements in sports performance. He pursued his applied research interests with Professor Gerta Vrbova of University College London, Professors Olga Hudlická and Mary Brown of the University of Birmingham and Professor Oona Scott of Imperial College London. Together their research led to the fabrication of neuromuscular stimulators which successfully produced non-fatiguing muscle cell behaviour and increased muscle strength in healthy volunteers and children with muscular dysfunction.

The Olympic Committee under Professor Samaranch and Patrick Shamash, MD approved the use of these stimulators for athletes as a natural (non-doping) means of improving muscle performance. Additionally, at the World Olympic Museum in Lausanne (2003–2004), Laurent River organized the exhibition 'Sports Performance et Equilibre' in which Cywinski's stimulators were exhibited.

During this time in Switzerland some of Cywinski's projects and highlights included the development of stimulators for functional rehabilitation in cooperation with Professor Charles Gobelet, director of SUVA, a public sector insurer in Switzerland as well as the development of stimulators for skin rejuvenation which was performed in conjunction with Dr. Welli, the medical director of Clinique La Prairie (Clarins, Switzerland). In the years 1999 through 2005 he was invited by Jean-Pierre Rausis and Professor Herve Borland, Ph.D. to serve as one of the directors of the scientific board of the world-famous Dalle Molle Institute of Artificial Intelligence Research in Ticino, Switzerland.

Outside of Switzerland he was an associate professor of the Department of Health Sciences of the University of East London, UK. There, jointly with Professor Matthew Morrissey, he conducted research and doctoral thesis supervision to Dr. A. Man, who for her doctorate work used Cywinski's stimulator to reduce edema in legs. This work was subsequently published in the Journal of Sport Science and Medicine. His institute participated at the inter-university international research programs. This resulted in several publications in the field of electro stimulation.

In 1996, he was invited by the Royal Society of Medicine in London to give a lecture on his research interests.

==== France, 2005–2011 ====
In 2005, Cywinski moved to Paris, France and was a consultant to Ad Rem Technology SARL, where he invented the Veinoplus stimulator to correct impaired blood circulation in leg veins. In September 2010, Cywinski was invited by Peter Glovitzki, director of the Mayo Clinic's Gonda Vascular Institute to lecture on the application of the Veinoplus at the Mayo Clinic Continued Medical Education Seminar in Paris.

When in Paris and with Ad Rem Technology, Cywinski, served as Chief Technology Officer, continued developments and marketing certification (FDA) of Veinoplus stimulators and novel nano-stimulation devices for angiology and sports medicine applications as well as for athletic performance improvement.

In 2007, Cywinski became manager and sole shareholder of EMSTIM, EURL, in Paris. EMSTIM is a research institute for the development of medical devices and therapeutics. It is currently accredited by the French Ministry of Higher Education as an R&D institute for developments in medical technologies. This resulted in a Veinoplus patent (assigned to Ad Rem Technology) and to more developments of novel electro-stimulation devices/techniques.

Hemodynamic research on Cywinski's Veinoplus stimulators was performed and published by Professor Andrew Nicolaides and his team at Imperial College London, England. This research proved that stimulation of the calf muscles by the Veinoplus can be effective in preventing Deep Veinous Thrombosis (DVT) and Pulmonary Emboli (PE). If was also effective at improving circulatory problems in legs (including those of diabetics or those with peripheral artery disease) that if not treated can lead to non-healing ulcers or amputation.

=== Political endeavors, 1979–1994 ===
While continuously active in science, Cywinski's work and contacts led him into politics. In the years from 1979 to 1984 Cywinski was a trustee for the Presidential Committee of Ronald Reagan. In 1987, during the demise of the Communist era in Eastern Europe, Cywinski was asked by Zbigniew Brzezinski, the US Security Advisor to President Carter, to consult with the United States Senate Committee on Foreign Relations headed by Senator Richard Lugar to develop the economical aid program to Poland. As a result, the Polish-American Enterprise Fund (PAEF) was created. The PAEF brought multimillion-dollar financial aid to assist in creating many new, small, private-capital companies in post-communist Poland.

=== Major professional distinctions ===
- 1968: senior member of Institute of Electrical and Electronics Engineers Inc (IEEE)
- 1974: International Certificate in Clinical Engineering by the Association for the Advancement of Medical Instrumentation (AAMI)
- 1978: Fellow of American College of Cardiology (FACC)
- Cardiac Pacing Society, member
- New York Science Academy, past member

== Publications ==
=== Selected early research papers (1965–1970) ===
- J. Cywinski, M. Stopczyk. Differential calculations of biological electrograms in the applications of cardiology. Postepy Hig. Med. Dosw. 19(6), p:789-92, Nov-Dec 1965. PMID 5863050
- J.K. Cywinski and W.J. Wajszczuk. The recording of DC and very low frequency components of ECG. Med. Biol. Eng., 4 :179, 1966
- Wajszczuk W.J., Cywinski J.K. Observations on D.C. and very low frequency components of the electrocardiogram. Proc. Soc. Exp. Biol. Med. 123(1), p42-7, Oct 1966 PMID 5924453
- J.K. Cywinski. The digital method of radio-chromatography analysis (in polish) Doctoral thesis at Dept. of Electronics, Technical University of Warsaw, Poland, May, 1967
- M. Stopczyk and J.K. Cywinski. An implantable ventricular-controlled cardiac pacemaker. Proc. of 7th Int. Conf. Med. Bio. Eng., p69, Stockholm, Sweden, August, 1967
- M. Stopczyk and J.K. Cywinski. The effects of the electrical currents used for stimulation and defibrillation of the heart (in Polish). Pol. Archiw. Med. Wewn. 40 : 131, 1968
- J. Cywinski, M. Stopczyk. Adaptation of stimulator controlled by heart impulses for clinical purposes. Pol. Arch. Med. Wewn. 40(1) p:29-33, 1968 PMID 5638935
- J.K. Cywinski, A.C.K. Kutty and W.J. Wajzuck. An analogue of the nervous control of intrinsic cardiac pacemaker. Proc. 8th Int. Conf. On Med. Biol. Eng., p20-25, Chicago, July, 1969
- Z. Askanas, J.K. Cywinski, M. Stopczyk, Z. Kraszewski, L. Korczak, B. Bukowiecki. Tele-electrocardiographic equipment and its possibilities. In Materials Reh. Council of Int. Society of Cardiology, p123-130, Hohenried, West Germany, 1969
- E.L. Hall, J.K. Cywinski, G.E. Flaishchli and S.J. Dwyer. Digital filters for noise suppression in the exercise electrocardiogram. Proc. San Diego Biomed. Symposium, p23-26, 1970

=== Selected research papers (1971–1985) ===
- J.K. Cywinski, A.W. Hahn and J.B. Cooper. Implantable transmitters powered by bio-galvanic cells. In proceedings of 1972 San Diego Biomedical Symposium, p:113-120, published by San Diego Biomedical Symposium, 1972.
- J.K. Cywinski. Implantation of microelectronics and biotelemetry. Engineering in the Hospital, NEREM Record, part 2, p 113–117, Boston, Ma. November, 1972
- J.K. Cywinski, H.H. Ali, R. Clintron, and R.S. Newbower. Neuromuscular Transmission Monitor. In proceedings of 27 ACEMB, p85, published by the Alliances for Engineering in Medicine and Biology, Chevy Chase, Md, October, 1974.
- J.K. Cywinski. Advances in Cardiac Pacemakers. New power Sources and Circuit Technology. In IEEE Intercon Conference Record, Session 2 : Electronic Instrumentation in Medicine, p2/4-1 to 2/4-4. Published by IEEE Inc., New-York, 1975.
- P.B. Kurnik, J.K. Cywinski, L.M. Zir, J.B. Newell, J.W. Harthorne. Frequency and amplitude analysis of endocardial electrograms. Implications for demand pacemaker design. Proceedings of International Conference on Biomedical Transducers, Additif aux actes du Colloque Biocapt 75, p A.I.9, 3–10, Paris, November, 1975.
- J.K. Cywinski. Biopotentials. Session Chairman at Colloque International sur les Capteurs Biomédicaux, Biocapt. 75, Paris, November 1975
- W.H. Harris, E.L. Thrasher, B.J-L. Moyen, R.H. Cobden, L.A. Davis, D.A. Mackenzie, J.K. Cywinski. Stimulation of fracture healing by direct current : an experimental study in dogs. In transactions of 22 Annual Conf. of orthopaedic Research Society, p203, New Orleans, Louisiana, January, 1976.
- W.H. Harris, B. J-L. Moyen, E.L. Thrasher, L.A. Davis, R.H. Cobden, D.A. MacKenzie, J.K. Cywinski. Differential response to electrical stimulation : a distinction between induced osteogenesis in intact tibiae and the effect on fresh fracture defects in radii. Clinical Orthopaedics and Related Research p:31-10, 1977
- W. Irnich, J.K. Cywinski, P.W. DeSalvo. Clinical Engineering at the Massachusetts General Hospital in Boston (in German). Biomedizinische Technik. Band 22 s. 207–211, Heft 12/1977
- J.K. Cywinski, A.W. Hahn, F. Nichols and J.R. Easley. Performance of implanted biogalavanic pacemakers. PACE-pacing and Clinical Electrophysiology p:117-125, Vol.1, n°1, Jan. 1978
- J.K. Cywinski. Transcutaneous stimulation. Roundtable Chairman, AAMI, 17th annual meeting, San Francisco, May, 1982
- J.K. Cywinski, L.M. Cywinski, L. Lee. Medical Image distribution, storageand retrieval network : the M/NET. Proceedings of SPIE vol. 418, p74-79. Publ. by Soc. for optical engineering SPIE May, 1983
- L.M. Cywinski, T.R. Cram, J. Cywinski. Medical Image viewing station design in a picture archiving and communication system (PACS). Proc. MEDCOMP 83 IEEE computer Soc. Int. Conf. Sept. 1983, Athens, Ohio
- J.K. Cywinski, L.M. Cywinski, L. Lee. Medical Image Distribution, Storage, and Retrieval Network : the M/NET. Proceedings of International Conference PACS II on Medical Applications of PACS. SPIE Publications, Vol.418, p74-79, Bellingham, WA. 1983
- M. Gray, J.K. Cywinski, L.M. Cywinski. Features of a Networked Medical Image Workstation called M/NET. SPIE Proceedings of Third International Conference on PACS, vol 536, p117/125, Society of Photo-Optical Instrumentation Engineers, Bellingham. WA. 1985

=== Selected research papers (last 25 years) ===
- J.K. Cywinski. Issues in automated handling and archiving of medical diagnostic images. IEEE Symposium on Policy Issues in Information and Communication Technologies in Medical Applications. IEEE cat N° UH 0181–8, p31-33 Rockville, Md. Sept. 1988
- G. Kidd, A. Maher, J.K. Cywinski. Programmable Muscle Stimulator. US patent 4,712,558 1988
- J.K. Cywinski, J.A. Vanden Brink. Review of Experience with PACS Cost Analysis Model. SPIE Proceedings, Medical Imaging III. Vol 1093, p535-538. SPIE Publ., Bellingham. WA. fEB. 1989
- J.K. Cywinski. Device for trophic stimulation of muscles. US Patent nr. 5,350,415; issued in 1994, European Appl. EP0706 806 Al publ. 1996 Canadian Patent nr. 2,132,157 issued in 1999
- A. Höflchner, E. Müller, J. Cywinski. Comparison of training effects on isometric strength of quadriceps femoris after training with electrical stimulation, voluntary exercise training and combined training. Presented and printed (abstract) in the Proceedings of the 4th Congress of the European College of Sport Science, Rome, July, 1999
- I.O.W. Man, M.C. Morrissey, J. Cywinski. Effect of neuromuscular electrical stimulation on knee swelling after knee surgery : preliminary findings. Phys. Ther. Vol 86, n°7, July 2000
- P. Flaction, J. Cywinski. Effects of Electrostimulation vs. physical training on quadriceps force difference : implications for skiers. p381-390 in Science and skiing, E. Müller et al., eds Verlagkovac, Hamburg, Germany, 2001. ISBN 3-8300-0287-4
- I.O.W. Man, G.S. Lepar, M.C. Morrissey, J.K. Cywinski. Effect of neuromuscular electrical stimulation on foot/ankle volume during standing. Med. Sci. Sports Exerc. 35(4), p:630-4, Apr. 2003 PMID 12673147
- I.O.W. Man, M.C. Morrissey, J.K. Cywinski. Effects of neuromuscular electrical stimulation on ankle swelling in the early period after ankle sprain. Physical therapy. p53-65 Vol. 87, n°1. Jan. 2007
