= John S. Rumsfeld =

American cardiologist

- Born: June 16, 1964 (age 62)
- Education: University of California, Los Angeles; University of Chicago
- Occupation: Cardiologist

John S. Rumsfeld (born June 16, 1964) is an American cardiologist. He is the chief innovation officer for the American College of Cardiology, and professor of medicine at the University of Colorado School of Medicine. He was previously the national director of Cardiology for the U.S. Veterans Health Administration. Rumsfeld was named as chief innovation officer for American College of Cardiology in 2015.

== Career ==
Rumsfeld received his undergraduate degree in biology in 1986 from the University of California, Los Angeles, and his medical degree in 1991 from the University of Chicago. He completed internal medicine internship and residency at the University of California, San Francisco (1991–1994), and did a cardiology fellowship at the University of Colorado (1995–1999), where he received a doctoral degree in epidemiology in 1999. He has been a staff cardiologist in the VA Eastern Colorado Healthcare System and a faculty member of the Division of Cardiology, University of Colorado, since 1999. He was promoted to associate professor in 1994 and to professor in 2009.

== Research ==
Starting in 2004, he led the development and implementation of the VA's Clinical Assessment Reporting and Tracking (CART) Program. He continues to serve as national director for the program, which involves all 76 VA Medical Centers that do cardiac catheterization procedures

In 2005, he was named the chief science officer for the American College of Cardiology's National Cardiovascular Data Registry (NCDR) Program. He is also the current chair of the NCDR Management Board. He is a member of the American College of Cardiology board of trustees, and is the current chair of the American Heart Association's Quality of Care and Outcomes Research Council.

Rumsfeld is an associate editor for the journal Circulation: Cardiovascular Quality and Outcomes and is on the editorial board for the Journal of the American College of Cardiology. He is a Fellow of the American College of Cardiology, American Heart Association, and American College of Physicians.

In 2010, he was appointed acting national director of cardiology for the United States Department of Veterans Affairs (VA), and confirmed as director in 2011. He was a founding member of the national Cardiovascular Outcomes Research Consortium and the Colorado Cardiovascular Outcomes Research (C-COR) consortium, which includes the University of Colorado Denver Health and Hospitals, VA Eastern Colorado Healthcare System, and Kaiser Colorado. He served on the National Heart, Lung, and Blood Institute (NHLBI) Cardiovascular Outcomes Research Workgroup.

Rumsfeld's doctoral thesis and early cardiovascular outcomes research work principally focused on the measurement and predictors of patient health status outcomes, including patient symptom burden from disease, mental and physical functional status, and health-related quality of life.

He has had a long-standing research and clinical interest in the intersection of cardiovascular disease and depression. He has published a number of studies – and spoken nationally and internationally – on the topic. In recent years, his research has focussed on the effectiveness and safety of cardiovascular care delivery and therapeutics, building on his work with the ACC NCDR programs and national clinical quality programs in the VA.

== Select publications ==
Dr. Rumsfeld has more than 200 scientific publications, including original research, editorials, and scientific statements.

- Box TL; McDonell M; Helfrich CD; Jesse RL; Fihn SD; Rumsfeld JS (2010). "Strategies from a Nationwide Health Information Technology Implementation: The VA CART Story". Journal of General Internal Medicine. 25 (Suppl 1): 72–76. doi:10.1007/s11606-009-1130-6. ISSN 0884-8734. OCLC 535488475. PMC 2806964. PMID 20077156.
- Krumholz HM; Peterson ED; Ayanian J; Chin M; DeBusk R; Goldman L; Kiefe C; Rumsfeld JS; Spertus JA; Weintraub W (2005). "Report of the National Heart, Lung, and Blood Institute Working Group on Outcomes Research in Cardiovascular Disease". Circulation. 111 (23): 3158–3166. doi:10.1161/CIRCULATIONAHA.105.536102. ISSN 0009-7322. OCLC 1554748. PMID 15956152.
- Rumsfeld JS; MaWhinney S; McCarthy M; Shroyer ALW; VillaNueva CB; O'Brien M; Moritz TE; Henderson WG; Grover FL; Sethi GK; Hammermeister KE (1999). "Health-Related Quality Of Life As A Predictor Of Mortality Following Coronary Artery Bypass Graft Surgery". Journal of the American Medical Association. 281 (14): 1298–1303. doi:10.1001/jama.281.14.1298. ISSN 0098-7484. OCLC 1124917. PMID 10208145.
- ——; Magid DJ; Plomondon ME; Sacks J; Henderson W; Hlatky M; Sethi G; Morrison DA (2003). "Health-Related Quality of Life Following Percutaneous Coronary Intervention Versus Coronary Bypass Surgery in High-Risk Patients With Medically Refractory Ischemia". Journal of the American College of Cardiology. 41 (10): 1732–8. doi:10.1016/S0735-1097(03)00330-9. ISSN 0735-1097. OCLC 08909559. PMID 12767656.
- —— (2002). "Health Status and Clinical Practice: When Will They Meet?". Circulation. 106 (1): 5–7. doi:10.1161/01.CIR.0000020805.31531.48. ISSN 0009-7322. OCLC 1554748. PMID 12093759.
- ——; Havranek E; Masoudi FA; Tooley J; Jones P; Peterson ED; Krumholz HM; Spertus JA (2003). "Depressive Symptoms Are The Strongest Predictor of Short-Term Declines in Health Status in Patients with Heart Failure". Journal of the American College of Cardiology. 42 (10): 1811–1817. doi:10.1016/j.jacc.2003.07.013. ISSN 0735-1097. OCLC 08909559. PMID 14642693.
