= Circulation: Cardiovascular Imaging =

- Discipline: Cardiology
- Language: English
- Edited by: Robert J. Gropler

Publication details
- History: 2008–present
- Publisher: Lippincott Williams & Wilkins (United States)
- Impact factor: 8.589 (2021)

Standard abbreviations
- ISO 4: Circ.: Cardiovasc. Imaging

Links
- Journal homepage

Circulation: Cardiovascular Imaging is a scientific journal published by Lippincott Williams & Wilkins for the American Heart Association. The journals presents articles focusing on clinical trials and observational studies, with a focus on innovative imaging approaches to diagnosis cardiovascular disease.

== See also ==
- Circulation
- Circulation: Cardiovascular Interventions
- Journal of the American College of Cardiology
- European Heart Journal
