= Gerald Buckberg =

American surgeon

- Born: September 29, 1935
- Died: September 20, 2018 (aged 82)
- Education: Ohio State University and University of Cincinnati College of Medicine
- Known for: Introduction of blood cardioplegia, which is currently used by over 85% of surgeons in the United States and 75% of surgeons worldwide for adult and pediatric heart operations.
- Medical career
- Profession: surgeon
- Institutions: David Geffen School of Medicine at UCLA
- Research: Cardiothoracic Surgery

Gerald Buckberg (September 29, 1935 – September 20, 2018) was an American surgeon. His research initially centered in the area of myocardial protection and led to the introduction of blood cardioplegia, which is currently used by over 85% of surgeons in the United States and 75% of surgeons worldwide for adult and pediatric heart operations. He was a member of multiple surgical societies, including the American Association for Thoracic Surgery, American Surgical Association, and the Society of Thoracic Surgeons. He was Professor of Surgery at the David Geffen School of Medicine at UCLA.

== School and early career ==
Gerald D. Buckberg received his Cardiothoracic training at the UCLA Medical Center. He began his training at Johns Hopkins Hospital, where he studied with Alfred Blalock, world renowned for developing a procedure to help children with Blue Baby Syndrome (where insufficient blood travels to the lungs due to congenital heart defects). Buckberg went on to receive subsequent research training (following completion of his clinical heart surgery residency) at the Cardiovascular Institute at the University of California, San Francisco, where he worked with Julien Hoffman to discover a novel way to study blood supply in small regions of the heart and in other organs. This method (called radioactive microspheres) was seminal and continues to be used worldwide, despite its origin 44 years ago. Buckberg was called to active duty in the Air Force in 1967, during the Viet Nam war, and then joined the faculty at UCLA.

== Medical pioneer ==
Buckberg's early research led to the development of blood cardioplegia that dramatically elevated the safety of open heart surgeries around the world. His innovations included a device to deliver cardioplegia, novel catheters for administration either forward (via arteries) or backward (via veins), and a new cardioplegic solution. He continued developing new simplified techniques to rapidly and safely distribute cardioplegia solutions to all segments of the heart to better ensure their protective effects.

Subsequent investigative studies by Buckberg's team led to a new approach in the treatment of acute myocardial infarction (heart attack) that restores healthy function and avoids the development of congestive heart failure that often follows heart attacks. Additional specialized techniques were developed to save and restore early function to heart muscle in heart attack patients after time intervals that were previously thought to cause unavoidable and irreversible damage (i.e., more than 6 hours). Additional studies conducted by his team showed that employing blood cardioplegic techniques in surgical treatment of patients in shock following an acute heart attack, lowered mortality to below 10%, from the over 50% death rate previously associated with conventional methods. These new techniques continue to be tested internationally to verify their improved outcomes in heart attack patients who might otherwise sustain irreversible loss of heart muscle.

Buckberg introduced the concept of "unintended reoxygenation injury" when blue babies (cyanotic) are placed on cardiopulmonary bypass (heart-lung machine) to correct the congenital defect causing cyanosis. This study called attention to the role of active interventions, including antioxidants, to limit this injury, and provided the first evidence of a new biochemical pathway that causes this damage.

In 1998, Buckberg organized the RESTORE team, a group of leading surgeons and cardiologists from the U.S., Europe, Asia, and South America, to treat and correct congestive heart failure by altering ventricular geometry (as opposed to conventionally treating symptomatology). The groundbreaking surgical approach restores cardiac size and shape, whereby the failing heart's dilated spherical shape (like a basketball) is again made elliptical (like a football) and was built upon the contributions of Vincent Dor of Monaco. Initial success was found in 1198 congestive heart failure patients, and followed by an additional 5,000 highly successful surgeries worldwide. This research led to an NIH trial to study geometric changes in CHF patients, on which Buckberg was co-principal investigator and directed the Surgical Therapy Committee. The basis of this structural correction in congestive heart failure patients is linked to an innovative helical heart concept that has been studied experimentally by Buckberg, based on the theories of Francisco Torrent-Guasp.

Buckberg's continued research into this understanding of cardiac structure/function would later lead to the production of a DVD describing the Helical Heart. It was honored with the 2005 FREDDIE award (recognizing excellence in medical documentaries, videos, and CD-ROMs from around the world) in the category of Basic and Clinical Science, as well as Surgeon General's award for Outstanding Health Professional Entry.

In addition, Buckberg created a ballet, The Cardiac Dance; Spirals of Life, in 2007, in partnership with the College-Conservatory of Music at the University of Cincinnati. The dance revealed how helical heart structure affords a deeper comprehension of heart function and the treatment of heart diseases. DVDs of the performance were forwarded to departments of cardiac surgery in the United States and Canada.

Further innovative studies by Buckberg's teams achieved additional breakthroughs in treating sudden death syndrome, remedying disorders relating to the septum, and improving pacemaker effectiveness.

Buckberg received the American Association for Thoracic Surgery Scientific Achievement Award in May 2007, the highest award the Association bestows to honor an individual for scientific achievements in thoracic surgery. Buckberg was recognized for his seminal contributions in the field of myocardial preservation and elucidating the anatomy and pathophysiology of heart failure.

In June 2018, Gerald Buckberg published Solving the Mysteries of Heart Disease: Life-Saving Answers Ignored by the Medical Establishment, which follows his career as a cardiac surgeon and researcher. Written to inform the general public of the existence of medical advances in the cardiac field, many of which have yet to be adopted, the book describes Buckberg's discoveries and tells the stories behind each of them.

Buckberg was interviewed about his book by Barry Kibrick on his Emmy-winning series, Between the Lines, in September 2018. They discussed Buckberg's journey as a researcher dedicated to finding solutions to heart disease and its complications – solutions which, once adopted by the healthcare field, could transform heart treatments and improve outcomes for people worldwide.

A few weeks after the airing of his Barry Kibrick interview, Buckberg died from leiomyosarcoma cancer on September 20, 2018.

== Personal life ==
Buckberg was a marathon runner as well as a marathon ocean swimmer, and continued daily morning swims in UCLA's Masters Swim Club until his death. Having been married to Ingeborg, Buckberg is survived by two daughters and four grandchildren.

== Honors and awards ==
• Earl Bakken Scientific Achievement Award, The Society of Thoracic Surgeons (2000)

• Daniel Drake Award, University of Cincinnati (2000)

• Invited Basic Science Lecturer, American Association of Thoracic Surgeons (2001)

• Distinguished Alumni Award Recipient, University of Cincinnati College of Medicine (2001)

• Appointed Faculty Associate at Caltech to study the helical heart (2003)

• Freddie Award for DVD of "The Helical Heart," International Health & Medical Media Awards (2005)

• Scientific Achievement Award, American Association of Thoracic Surgeons (2007)

• Honorary Degree, Doctor of Science, Ohio State University (2007)

• Honorary Degree, Doctor of Science, University of Cincinnati (2007

• Gibbon Award for Outstanding Contribution to Science and Practice of Extracorporeal Circulation (2008)

• Longmire Legacy Award (2008)

• Honorary Membership in the German Society for Thoracic and Cardiovascular Surgery (2009)

• Clarence Crafoord Lecture, Denmark (2009)

• Associate Foreign Membership of French National Academy (2010)

• RAMS Academician Bakoulev Prize, Moscow (2015)

• UCLA Lifetime Achievement and Chairman's Award (2018)
