= Circulation: Cardiovascular Interventions =

- Discipline: Cardiology, Cardiovascular medicine
- Language: English
- Edited by: Sunil V. Rao

Publication details
- History: 2008–present
- Publisher: Lippincott Williams & Wilkins
- Frequency: Monthly
- Impact factor: 6.1 (2023)

Standard abbreviations
- ISO 4: Circ.: Cardiovasc. Interv.

Indexing
- ISSN: 1941-7640 (print); 1941-7632 (web)
- OCLC no.: 213503518

Links
- Journal homepage

Circulation: Cardiovascular Interventions is a monthly peer-reviewed medical journal published by Lippincott Williams & Wilkins for the American Heart Association. It focuses on interventional techniques for the surgical treatment of vascular disease, coronary artery disease, and structural heart disease. Other aspects of interventional cardiology are also part of its scope, including diagnostic and pharmacological aspects of cardiology as well as cardiovascular physiology. Primary types of articles published are original research, randomized controlled trials, and large registry studies.

== See also ==
- Circulation
- Circulation: Cardiovascular Imaging
- European Heart Journal
- Journal of the American College of Cardiology
