= Lake Louise criteria =

Cardiac MRI criteria for diagnosing myocarditis

The Lake Louise criteria are a set of diagnostic criteria for recognizing inflammation of the heart muscle (myocarditis) on cardiac magnetic resonance imaging (CMR). They were proposed in 2009 by an international consensus group of specialists and published as a white paper in the Journal of the American College of Cardiology.

The original version required two of three tissue signs, namely edema, hyperemia, and necrosis or fibrosis, for a scan to be read as consistent with myocardial inflammation. A 2018 revision, usually called the updated Lake Louise criteria, instead requires at least one T2-based marker of edema together with at least one T1-based marker of myocardial injury, and it allows quantitative T1 and T2 mapping to be used alongside conventional sequences.

The updated criteria form the basis of the CMR diagnostic criteria in the American College of Cardiology expert consensus pathway (2024) on myocarditis and in the European Society of Cardiology guidelines (2025), in which a scan that meets both criteria, together with a compatible clinical presentation, counts as a definite diagnosis.
