= JACC: Cardiovascular Interventions =

- Discipline: Cardiology
- Language: English
- Edited by: David J. Moliterno

Publication details
- History: 2008–present
- Publisher: Elsevier for the American College of Cardiology
- Frequency: monthly
- Impact factor: 11.075 (2021)

Standard abbreviations
- ISO 4: JACC: Cardiovasc. Interv.
- NLM: JACC Cardiovasc Interv

Indexing
- ISSN: 1936-8798 (print); 1876-7605 (web)

Links
- Journal homepage; Journal page on publisher's website; American College of Cardiology

JACC: Cardiovascular Intervention is a peer-reviewed sub-specialty medical journal published by Elsevier for the American College of Cardiology since 2008. The journal focus on articles on interventional cardiology, encompassing cardiac coronary and non-coronary interventions, including peripheral arteries and cerebrovasculature (e.g., carotid artery). The majority of articles report results from clinical trials illustrating evidence to inform and alter practice guidelines and experimental studies describing improved technologies and understanding of cardiac disease. The journal has a 5-Year Impact Factor of 9.605 (2018), is part of the American College of Cardiology journal family, and is ranked among the top 10 cardiology journals.

== Abstracting and indexing ==
The journal is indexed by Medline, PubMed, and scopus.

== Associated journals ==
Associated journals are the following:

- Journal of the American College of Cardiology
- JACC: Cardiovascular Imaging
- JACC: Clinical Electrophysiology

== See also ==
- European Heart Journal
- Circulatory system
