= Thomas Lüscher =

- Education: University of Zurich
- Occupation: Cardiologist
- Known for: Editor of the European Heart Journal (2009–2020)
- Medical career
- Profession: Physician
- Field: Cardiovascular physiology
- Institutions: University Hospital of Zürich; Royal Brompton and Harefield NHS Foundation Trust; Imperial College London
- Research: Endothelium; Cardiovascular disease

Thomas F. Lüscher is a Swiss professor of cardiology, director of research, education and development and a consultant cardiologist at the Royal Brompton and Harefield NHS Foundation Trust and Imperial College London, and director of the Center for Molecular Cardiology at the University of Zurich.

He completed his PhD in 1988 at the University of Basel, with a thesis titled "Endothelial Vasoactive Substances and Cardiovascular Disease", in which he looked at the role of chemicals derived from endothelium on cardiovascular disease. From 1996 to 2017, he was professor and chairman of cardiology at the University Hospital of Zürich and director of CardioVascular Research at the Institute of Physiology, part of the University of Zurich.

Lüscher was the editor of the European Heart Journal from 2009 to 2020, by which time he had studied the endothelium for over 30 years. He has described COVID-19 as ultimately an endothelial disease. In 2021 he addressed one of the most popular heart health questions, "are wine, chocolate and coffee good or bad for you?".

Lüscher received backlash after publishing an article in “Cardiovascular Medicine” in 2023, in which he criticised young doctors, negatively stating a „work-life balance is more important than a career“ to the next generation of doctors and attributing them a „victim mentality“, as well as calling them „non resilient“.

== Early life and education ==
Thomas Felix Lüscher is the son of doctor of medicine Emil Lüscher (1904–1977). He studied at the University of Zurich's medical school from 1972 to 1978, and completed his PhD in 1988 at the University of Basel, with a thesis titled "Endothelial Vasoactive Substances and Cardiovascular Disease", in which he looked at the role of chemicals derived from cells that line blood vessels on cardiovascular disease, such as high blood pressure, atherosclerosis, coronary artery disease, cerebral vasospasm and diabetic vascular disease. There he worked with Paul M. Vanhoutte and was inspired by the work of Robert F. Furchgott and John V. Zawadzki who in 1980 showed that the single-layered inner most lining (endothelium) of a large blood vessel controlled underlying vascular smooth muscle cells by releasing endothelium-derived relaxing factor, later found to be nitric oxide. With Vanhoutte, he authored the book The Endothelium – Modulator of Cardiovascular Function (1988).

== Career ==
Lüscher trained in echocardiography and carried out cardiovascular research at the Mayo Clinic in Rochester before taking up a professorship in pharmacotherapy at University of Basel and then as interventional cardiologist and professor of cardiology at the University of Berne. From 1996 to 2017, he was professor and chairman of cardiology at the University Hospital of Zürich and director of CardioVascular Research at the Institute of Physiology, part of the University of Zurich. Working in the United States, Lüscher was associate editor of the American Heart Association's journal Circulation. In 2009 he was appointed editor of the European Heart Journal, a position he held until 2020. For the European Society of Cardiology, he co-founded the ESC journal ethics committee, to examine papers and investigate allegations of misconduct.

Since October 2017, he has been director of research, education and development and a consultant cardiologist at the Royal Brompton and Harefield NHS Foundation Trust and Imperial College London, and director of the Center for Molecular Cardiology at the University of Zurich.

By the COVID-19 pandemic of 2020, he had been studying the endothelium for over 30 years. He says that COVID-19 is ultimately an endothelial disease and stated that “the concept that the endothelium is the main target of this virus is really very important.”

Lüscher also researches the effects of chocolate and the flavanol epicatechin, partially funded by Nestlé and MARS.

== Selected publications ==
The Institute for Scientific Information has rated Lüscher as one of the 0.5% most cited scientists worldwide.

=== Articles ===
- Lüscher, Thomas F.; Barton, Matthias (1997). "Biology of the Endothelium". Clinical Cardiology. 20 (S2): II–3–II-10. doi:10.1002/j.1932-8737.1997.tb00006.x. ISSN 1932-8737. PMC 7509692. PMID 9422846. S2CID 45138260.
- Creager, Mark A.; Lüscher, Thomas F.; null, null; Cosentino, Francesco; Beckman, Joshua A. (23 September 2003). "Diabetes and Vascular Disease". Circulation. 108 (12): 1527–1532. doi:10.1161/01.CIR.0000091257.27563.32. PMID 14504252. S2CID 27529938.
- Flammer, Andreas J.; Hermann, Frank; Sudano, Isabella; Spieker, Lukas; Hermann, Matthias; Cooper, Karen A.; Serafini, Mauro; Lüscher, Thomas F.; Ruschitzka, Frank; Noll, Georg; Corti, Roberto (20 November 2007). "Dark Chocolate Improves Coronary Vasomotion and Reduces Platelet Reactivity". Circulation. 116 (21): 2376–2382. doi:10.1161/CIRCULATIONAHA.107.713867. PMID 17984375. S2CID 14807400.
- Corti, Roberto; Flammer, Andreas J.; Hollenberg, Norman K.; Lüscher, Thomas F. (17 March 2009). "Cocoa and Cardiovascular Health". Circulation. 119 (10): 1433–1441. doi:10.1161/CIRCULATIONAHA.108.827022. PMID 19289648. S2CID 8342630.
- Libby, Peter; Lüscher, Thomas (21 August 2020). "COVID-19 is, in the end, an endothelial disease". European Heart Journal. 41 (32): 3038–3044. doi:10.1093/eurheartj/ehaa623. PMC 7470753. PMID 32882706.
- Lüscher, Thomas F (24 October 2021). "Wine, chocolate, and coffee: forbidden joys?". European Heart Journal. 42 (44): 4520–4522. doi:10.1093/eurheartj/ehab654. PMID 34689207.

=== Books ===
- Lüscher, Thomas Felix (1988). Endothelial vasoactive substances and cardiovascular disease. Basel. ISBN 978-3-8055-4675-1. OCLC 610784230.
- Coronary artery graft disease: mechanisms and prevention. Berlin: Springer-Verlag. 1994. ISBN 978-3-540-57438-5. OCLC 30319185. (Co-author)
- The ESC textbook of cardiovascular medicine. Oxford: Oxford University Press. 2019. ISBN 978-0-19-878490-6. OCLC 1080860671. (Co-author)
- The endothelium: modulator of cardiovascular function. Boca Raton: CRC Press. 2020. ISBN 978-1-000-08331-6. OCLC 1180246244. (Co-author)
