= Alain Carpentier =

French surgeon

Alain Frédéric Carpentier
- Born: 11 August 1933 (age 92); Toulouse, Haute-Garonne, France
- Known for: Mitral Valve Repair
- Awards: Prix mondial Cino Del Duca (1996), Medallion for Scientific Achievement (2005), Lasker Prize (2007)
- Scientific career
- Fields: Cardiac surgery
- Institutions: Pierre and Marie Curie University

Alain Frédéric Carpentier (born 11 August 1933) is a French cardiac surgeon whom the President of the American Association for Thoracic Surgery calls the "father of modern mitral valve repair". He is most well-known for the development and popularization of a number of mitral valve repair techniques. In 1996, he performed the first minimally invasive mitral valve repair in the world and in 1998 he performed the first robotic mitral valve repair with the da Vinci Surgical System prototype. He is the recipient of the 2007 Lasker Prize.

== Biography ==
He received his MD from the University of Paris in 1966 and his PhD from the same university in 1975. A professor emeritus at Pierre and Marie Curie University, in the 1980s Carpentier published a landmark paper on mitral valve repair entitled The French Correction. A visiting professor at Mount Sinai School of Medicine in New York City, he currently heads the Department of Cardiovascular Surgery at the Hôpital Européen Georges-Pompidou in Paris. In 1986, he and Gilles Dreyfus performed the first artificial heart implant in Europe.

Carpentier is a member of the French Academy of Sciences and sits on the Board of Directors of the World Heart Foundation. The recipient of numerous awards, including the 1996 Prix mondial Cino Del Duca, in 2005 the American Association for Thoracic Surgery (AATS) bestowed its Medallion for Scientific Achievement for only the fifth time in its history. In announcing Carpentier as the recipient, the AATS also noted that he is "one of the foremost medical philanthropists in the world, having established a premier cardiac center in Vietnam a decade ago where over 1,000 open-heart cases are now performed annually. In addition, he has founded cardiac surgery programs in 17 French-speaking countries in Africa." In October 2001, he received an Honorary Doctor of Medicine and Surgery degree from University of Pavia.

In 2006, Carpentier received considerable media attention in the United States as the surgeon who performed an emergency mitral valve repair procedure on Charlie Rose when the PBS television interviewer fell ill while en route to Damascus to interview Syrian president Bashar al-Assad.

In 1989, Carpentier pioneered work to use the patient's own skeletal muscle (the latimissus dorsi muscle) to repair the failing myocardium, a procedure known as cardiomyoplasty, which has since advanced into the exciting realms of tissue engineering science. In 2008, Carpentier announced a fully implantable artificial heart will be ready for clinical trial by 2011, and for alternative to transplant in 2013. It was developed and will be manufactured by him, Biomedical firm Carmat, and venture capital firm Truffle. The prototype uses electronic sensors and is made from chemically treated animal tissues, called "biomaterials," or a "pseudo-skin" of biosynthetic, microporous materials, amid another US team's prototype called 2005 MagScrew Total Artificial Heart, and Japan and South Korea researchers are racing to produce similar projects. The first clinical trial are under process since 2013.

From 2009 to 2012, Carpentier was vice-president and then president of the French Academy of Sciences.

== Publications ==
- Alain Carpentier, David Adams and Farzan Filsoufi (2010). Carpentier's reconstructive valve surgery. Missouri: Saunders Elsevier. 368 pp. ISBN 9780721691688. Illustrated by Alain Carpentier and Marcia Williams.
- Chauvaud S, Carpentier A (June 2008). "Ebstein's anomaly: the Broussais approach". Multimedia Manual of Cardio-Thoracic Surgery. 74 (2): 438–43. doi:10.1510/mmcts.2007.003038. PMID 24415583.
- Cortes-Morichetti M, Frati G, Schussler O, et al. (November 2007). "Association between a cell-seeded collagen matrix and cellular cardiomyoplasty for myocardial support and regeneration". Tissue Engineering. 13 (11): 2681–7. doi:10.1089/ten.2006.0447. PMID 17691866.
- Chachques JC, Azarine A, Mousseaux E, El Serafi M, Cortes-Morichetti M, Carpentier AF (June 2007). "MRI evaluation of local myocardial treatments: epicardial versus endocardial (Cell-Fix catheter) injections". Journal of Interventional Cardiology. 20 (3): 188–96. doi:10.1111/j.1540-8183.2007.00255.x. PMID 17524110.
- Martinod E, Seguin A, Holder-Espinasse M, et al. (March 2005). "Tracheal regeneration following tracheal replacement with an allogenic aorta". The Annals of Thoracic Surgery. 79 (3): 942–8, discussion 949. doi:10.1016/j.athoracsur.2004.08.035. PMID 15734409.
- Chachques JC, Duarte F, Cattadori B, et al. (August 2004). "Angiogenic growth factors and/or cellular therapy for myocardial regeneration: a comparative study". The Journal of Thoracic and Cardiovascular Surgery. 128 (2): 245–53. doi:10.1016/j.jtcvs.2004.04.007. PMID 15282461.
- Chachques JC, Acar C, Herreros J, et al. (March 2004). "Cellular cardiomyoplasty: clinical application". Ann. Thorac. Surg. 77 (3): 1121–30. doi:10.1016/j.athoracsur.2003.09.081. hdl:10171/18566. PMID 14992951.]
- Martinod E, Seguin A, Pfeuty K, et al. (May 2003). "Long-term evaluation of the replacement of the trachea with an autologous aortic graft". The Annals of Thoracic Surgery. 75 (5): 1572–8, discussion 1578. doi:10.1016/S0003-4975(03)00120-6. PMID 12735581.
- Chachques JC, Argyriadis PG, Fontaine G, et al. (May 2003). "Right ventricular cardiomyoplasty: 10-year follow-up". The Annals of Thoracic Surgery. 75 (5): 1464–8. doi:10.1016/S0003-4975(02)04823-3. PMID 12735563.
- Zakine G, Martinod E, Fornes P, et al. (February 2003). "Growth factors improve latissimus dorsi muscle vascularization and trophicity after cardiomyoplasty". The Annals of Thoracic Surgery. 75 (2): 549–54. doi:10.1016/S0003-4975(02)04332-1. PMID 12607671.
- Grinda JM, Latremouille C, Berrebi AJ, et al. (August 2002). "Aortic cusp extension valvuloplasty for rheumatic aortic valve disease: midterm results". The Annals of Thoracic Surgery. 74 (2): 438–43. doi:10.1016/S0003-4975(02)03698-6. PMID 12173826.

== Honors ==
- Honorary degree, University of Pavia, 2001
