= Guasp =

Guasp is a surname. Notable people with the surname include:

- Francisco Torrent-Guasp (1931–2005), Spanish cardiologist
- Patricia Guasp (born 1977), Spanish politician
