= William C. Roberts =

American physician (1932–2023)

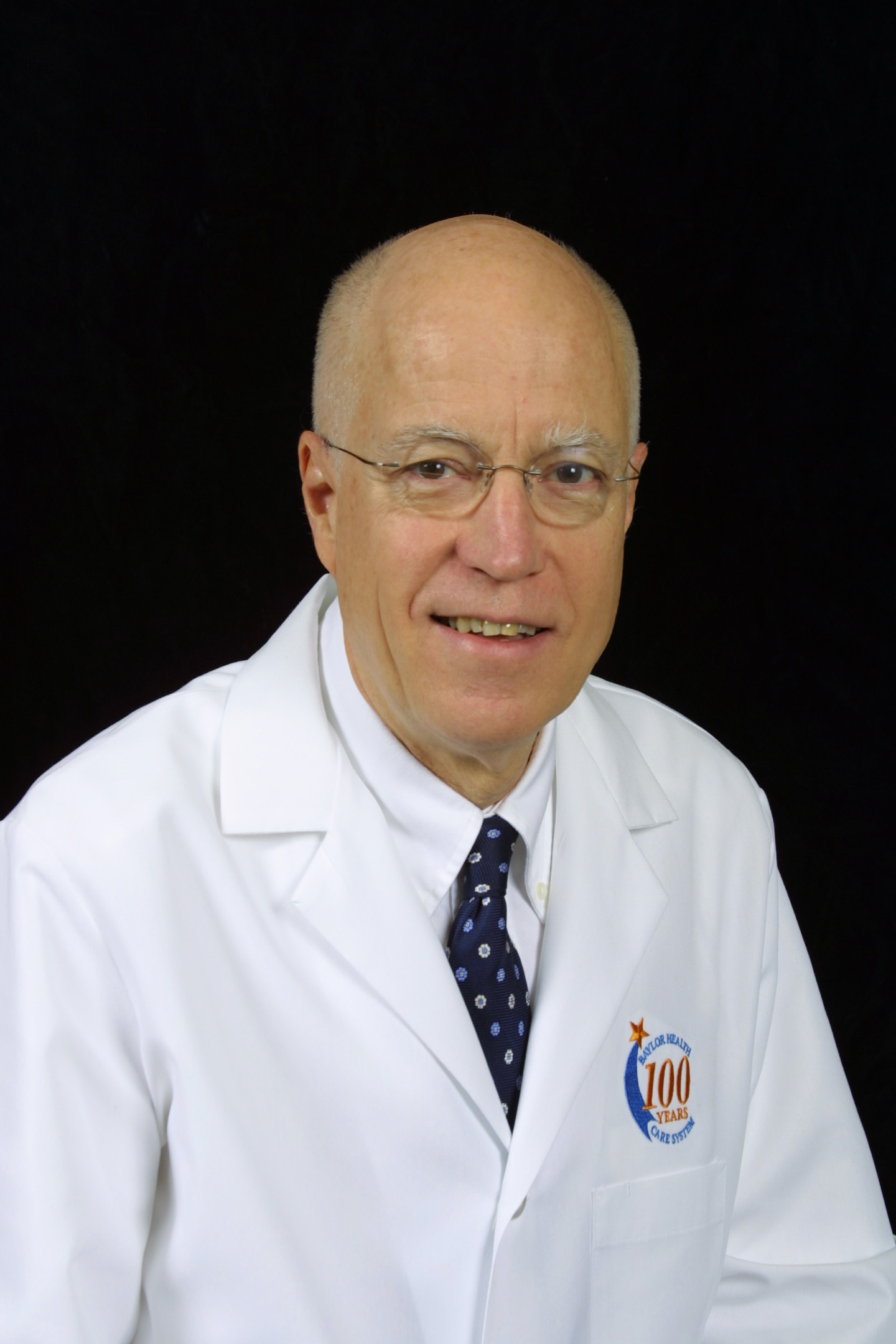
- Born: September 11, 1932; Atlanta, Georgia
- Died: June 15, 2023 (aged 90)
- Education: Emory University
- Scientific career
- Fields: Cardiology, pathology
- Workplaces: National Institutes of Health, Baylor University Medical Center

William Clifford Roberts (September 11, 1932 – June 15, 2023) was an American physician specializing in cardiac pathology.

He was a Master of the American College of Cardiology, a leading cardiovascular pathologist, and the former editor of both the American Journal of Cardiology and the Baylor University Medical Center Proceedings.

== Background and early education ==
William C. Roberts was born in Atlanta, Georgia on September 11, 1932, the second of three sons to Stewart Ralph Roberts and Ruby Viola Holbrook. His father Stewart was a prominent faculty physician for Emory University Medical Center, attending patients alongside his mother who served as his nurse. The children were raised in the city until 1935 when the family moved to a rural farm 12 miles outside Atlanta where they would remain for the next six years. Roberts attended public schools in Avendale, Georgia, and then Atlanta, Georgia from the 5th grade onward. Roberts describes himself as a below-average student until 9th grade when an algebra teacher motivated him to pursue greater academic achievement.

In 1937, Stewart Roberts suffered a heart attack which disabled him until his death in 1941. Though this event would later come to cast great influence on Roberts' career, his initial undergraduate studies at Southern Methodist University were in English with aims toward a career in business. During this time, Roberts also joined the fraternity Phi Delta Theta. By junior year, Roberts' ambitions had shifted to medicine in earnest. In 1954, Roberts graduated early from Southern Methodist University with a bachelor's degree in the arts, having been accepted to Emory University's School of Medicine. To earn money, Roberts worked for the National Forest Service for the three months between college and medical school. Early in his medical school training, Roberts proved to be a gifted anatomist and earned a prestigious thoracic surgery externship at Walter Reed Army Medical Center before graduating Emory in 1958 with his medical doctorate.

== Medical career ==
=== Postgraduate Training ===
After graduating from Emory, and despite his previous experiences in anatomy and surgery, Roberts served as an intern in medicine at Boston City Hospital before pursuing a 3-year residency in anatomic pathology at the National Institutes of Health in Bethesda, Maryland. It was here, working with attending physicians such as Glenn Morrow and Eugene Braunwald that his career began to focus on cardiovascular pathology, and he focused his training exclusively on autopsies and surgical pathology. He also began reading the works of Jesse Edwards, which he credits with helping to develop both his style of writing and strong interests in medical authorship and publications. He next served as a resident on the Osler Medical Service at Johns Hopkins Hospital in Baltimore before spending an additional year as a fellow in cardiovascular disease at the National Institutes of Health. This extensive training conferred upon Roberts unique credentials both as an anatomic pathologist and a clinically trained cardiologist.

=== National Institutes of Health ===
From July, 1964 to March, 1993, Roberts served as the first head of the newly created pathology section at the National Heart, Lung, and Blood Institute, a division of the National Institutes of Health. Here, he continued to work with notable cardiac physicians including Eugene Braunwald, Willis Hurst, and Glenn Morrow. Federal money for cardiovascular research, a national priority since the conclusion of World War II allowed for rapid expansion of the program. Roberts soon had 3 pathology fellows per year working with him, and he worked long hours alongside them - usually six nights per week.

The pathology section of the NHLBI was substantial but in Roberts' first year only 25 cardiac specimens were available for study. Determined to catalog the largest possible collection of anatomic cardiac pathology, Roberts personally canvassed more than a dozen institutions each month to collect heart specimens which he would examine and return with completed autopsy results to their parent institutions. Among those hospitals contributing to his collections were Georgetown, George Washington University, Children's National Medical Center and Johns Hopkins Hospital as well as the Washington, D.C. Veteran's Affairs hospital and National Naval Medical Center. Collectively, Roberts was soon studying more than 50 hearts per month, a twenty-fivefold increase over those available from the NIH alone.

Despite major achievements by the institution in the understanding of cardiovascular diseases, Roberts was frustrated by growing difficulties attracting pathologists interested in cardiovascular disease. These difficulties were compounded by the closure of the NIH cardiac surgery program in 1987, greatly limiting the quantity and diversity of pathology available for study.

=== Baylor University Medical Center ===
In March 1993, 32 years after starting at the NIH, Roberts left the National Institutes of Health to join the faculty of Baylor University Medical Center, the flagship of a large hospital network located in the Dallas/Fort Worth metroplex. Working in a laboratory built for him by the hospital, he continued to study cardiac pathology and had published more than 300 articles since. He was also an active participant in the ongoing training of cardiovascular disease and pathology fellows.

== Academic contributions ==
=== Journal articles ===
Roberts published over 1600 articles, almost all of them in peer-reviewed publications. The majority of his original scientific publications focused on anatomic aspects of cardiovascular disease. In addition, Roberts wrote or co-authored a number of articles discussing risk factors and risk-factor management in cardiovascular disease. As editor for both the Baylor University Medical Center Proceedings and The American Journal of Cardiology, Roberts published a number of editorials discussing current trends in cardiovascular medicine.

=== Books ===
Roberts wrote or co-wrote 11 individual titles. In chronological order, these are:

1. Classification of Heart Disease in Childhood (1970, 70pp.)
2. A Manual of Nomenclature and Coding of Cardiovascular Disease in Children: a Supplement to the Systematized Nomenclature of Pathology (1970, 69pp.)
3. Congenital Heart Disease in Adults (1979, 574pp.)
4. Facts and Ideas from Anywhere 2000
5. Facts and Ideas from Anywhere 2000–2006
6. Facts and Ideas from Anywhere 2011 to 2015
7. Collected Interviews of Baylor University Medical Center Physicians and Administrators Published in Baylor University Medical Center Proceedings (1995-2015, 956pp.)
8. Interviews: Published in The American Journal of Cardiology 1982-2015 Volume 1: A-K (2016, 69pp.)
9. Interviews: Published in The American Journal of Cardiology 1982-2015 Volume 1: L-Z (2016, 584pp.)
10. From-the-Editor Columns: Published in The American Journal of Cardiology 1982-2015 (2016, 632pp.)

Roberts was also editor of a series of books entitled Cardiology which were published in annual editions continuously from 1982-1999. Each of these books summarized the major achievements and discoveries in cardiology for their respective years.

== Organizational Contributions to Medicine ==
=== American College of Cardiology ===
Roberts was actively involved in the leadership of the American College of Cardiology from 1971-1982 in the capacities listed below.

=== American Heart Association ===
Roberts was actively involved in a number of activities for the American Heart Association including serving as a reviewer for their annual scientific sessions. He was also a fellow of the Council of Clinical Cardiology since 1971 and, since July 1994 was a member of the Dallas AHA affiliate's board of trustees.

=== Williamsburg Conference on Heart Disease ===
Each year since 1973, Roberts served as chief administrator and host of an annual course in cardiology held in Williamsburg, Virginia. Attendees were from across the country and attend three days of sessions on varying current topics in cardiology, each led by a noted expert in the relevant field.

=== Baylor University Medical Center Proceedings ===
In April, 1994, Roberts was appointed as editor of the Baylor University Medical Center Proceedings, a peer-reviewed and PubMed-indexed periodical of primarily regional interest in North Texas. Roberts himself contributed a column to each issue entitled "Facts and Ideas from Anywhere", an homage to one of the guiding principles he ascribes to his colleague Eugene Braunwald.

=== American Journal of Cardiology ===
Roberts was appointed to chair the publications committee of the American College of Cardiology (ACC) in 1976 by then-president Dean Mason, and continued to serve in this position for the next six years. In 1982, the publisher of the American Journal of Cardiology and the ACC, the organization which had founded it, parted ways. The ACC went on to form the Journal of the American College of Cardiology ("JACC") and took with it editor Simon Dack, leaving the AJC without an editor. Roberts was tapped to fill this position and readily accepted. He held the editor-in-chief position continuously ever since until shortly before his death.

Roberts stated that his goals as editor-in-chief were to increase the "fun" of authorship and help encourage authors to contribute meaningful information to the sphere of cardiology while minimizing the political complexities associated with the process of academic publication. In addition, Roberts published an extensive collection of more than 125 oral histories of prominent figures in the history and present of medicine, with a special focus on those contributing to the understanding and treatment of cardiovascular disease.

== Notable awards ==
- 1978: Gifted Teacher (American College of Cardiology)

(Roberts' distinction here follows that of his admired contemporary Jesse Edwards in 1977)

- 1979: Public Health Service Commendation Medal
- 1983: College Medalist (American College of Chest Physicians)
- 1984: Distinguished Medical Achievement (Emory University Medical Alumni Assn)
- 1994: Distinguished Achievement (Society of Cardiovascular Pathology)
- 1995: Honorary Doctorate of Science, Far Eastern University, Manila, Philippines
- 1996: Distinguished Alumnus (Southern Methodist University)
- 2004: Master of the American College of Cardiology

(Limited to a maximum of 3 per year with 1 additional award to the current president of the ACC)

- 2016: Recipient of the Lifetime Achievement Award of The American College of Cardiology
