= Veinoplus =

Medical device treating vascular diseases

VEINOPLUS is a FDA approved class IIa medical device powered by Dynapulse Medical. It is indicated for the treatment of vascular diseases. This is a neuromuscular stimulator developed by an American scientist, Jozef Cywinski.

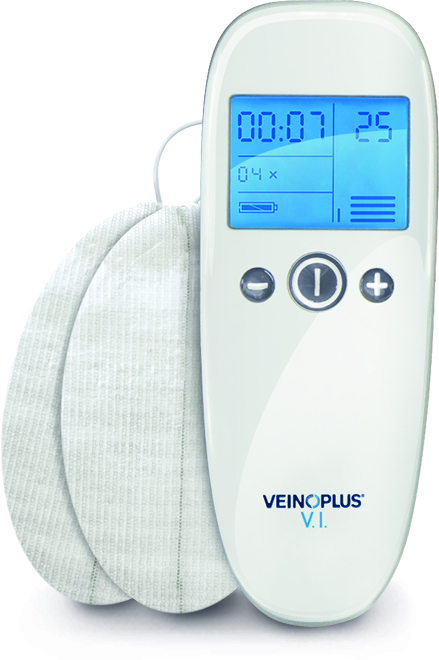
Veinoplus

== History ==
- 2004: Veinoplus design
- 2005: Princeps study (first published clinical study)
- 2011: Distributed in 25 countries.

== Description ==
Veinoplus is composed of a pocket-size device linked to two electrodes. The device has three buttons: a central one to turn on and off the device and two buttons marked “+” and “-” to adjust the intensity of stimulation. The electrodes have to be placed on the calf: either both electrodes on one calf if the venous disease affects only one leg, or one electrode on each calf if the pathology concerns both legs.

== Veinoplus technology ==
Veinoplus technology is based on the principle of electrostimulation. Thanks to a 9V battery, the device delivers electrical impulses with low frequency and low voltage. Input power is below 0.3W and output power is under 0.05W. The difference between Veinoplus and others electrical muscle stimulators is due to the waveform of the impulses. With this unique waveform, the electrical field can deeply get through the calf and so stimulate an important volume of tissue. As a consequence, Veinoplus triggers deep muscular contractions even if both electrodes are over one meter apart, for instance with one electrode on each calf.

Veinoplus produces safe and painless electrical impulses. Actually, the signal's intensity is below limits authorized by the Association for the Advancement of Medical Instrumentation and American National Standards Institute (AAMI / ANSI; NS-4; 1986/2002). Moreover, the device doesn't generate excessive electromagnetic interference. Thus it can be used in a plane, except during take-off and landing. Finally, a study on pregnant women has proven that Veinoplus has no side effects on foetus and pregnancy.

== Clinical data ==
=== Physiological properties ===
Veinoplus activates the calf muscular pump which is responsible for 80% of the venous return. The pulsating calf contractions compress deep veins and pump the venous blood against gravity towards the heart.

We can highlight 3 principal hemodynamic effects:

- removal of venous stasis
- increase of venous outflow in terms of volume and velocity
- inhibition of reflux in superficial and deep veins.

=== Indications ===
Veinoplus is indicated for the treatment of chronic venous insufficiency symptoms:

- painful or heavy legs
- edema
- night cramps
- restless legs
- post-thrombotic syndrome.

Veinoplus could also ease chronic venous ulcer healing.

Veinoplus can be used either by patients suffering from venous disease or at risk of venous disorders:

- prolonged immobilization (long flights, jobs with a prolonged sitting or standing position...)
- varicose veins
- overweight
- lack of physical exercise
- high heat.

=== Contra-indications ===
The only contra-indication of Veinoplus is wearing a pacemaker.
