= Julien Hoffman =

Julien I.E. Hoffman, (July 26, 1925 in Salibury, S.Rhodesia - June 23, 2020) was a pediatric cardiologist and professor of pediatrics and a senior member of the Cardiovascular Research Institute at the University of California, San Francisco. He has also worked at the Moffitt-Long Hospital at the UCSF Medical Center, and served on the medical advisory committee for the SIDS Alliance.

== Early years ==
In the 1940s, while an Honors student working on spermatogenesis, Hoffman developed a close relationship with Sydney Brenner and Phillip V. Tobias. Hoffman graduated from the University of the Witwatersrand in Johannesburg, South Africa in 1949 and began an internship in Internal Medicine at Johannesburg General Hospital in 1950 and in Surgery there in 1951. In 1952 he began an Internship in Internal Medicine at Central Middlesex Hospital, in London, England.

== Career ==
Hoffman became a Registrar in Internal Medicine at Central Middlesex Hospital in 1953 and the same position at Johannesburg General Hospital in 1955. He became a Research Fellow in Cardiology at the Royal Postgraduate Medical School in London, in 1957, a fellow in Pediatric Cardiology at the Children's Hospital, Boston in 1959 and Senior Fellow in Cardiology at the Cardiovascular Research Institute in San Francisco in 1960, working there since 1966. Hoffman obtained his diplomate from the American Board of Pediatrics in 1968 and his MD in 1970.

In 1989, Hoffman became Chairman of the UCSF Medical Center's Cardiovascular Research Institute Animal Research Committee and in 1991 chairman on the Oversight Committee on Fetal Surgery. He became Professor Emeritus of Pediatrics in 1994. He has considerable expertise in sudden infant death syndrome (SIDS), and is cited as providing a valuable contribution to the field of cardiology. Hoffman also serves on the editorial board of Circulation Research Journal of the American Heart Association and is a reviewer for journals such as American Journal of Cardiology, the American Journal of Genetics, the American Review of Respiratory Disease Circulation, Pediatrics, and The Journal of Pediatrics. Hoffman has written books such as The Natural and Unnatural History of Congenital Heart Disease (2009). He is co-editor with James Moller and others of Pediatric Cardiovascular Medicine, published by Wiley-Blackwell in 2012.

According to the University of California, his research is "currently related to the natural history of different congenital heart diseases and the results of surgery or other forms of treatment for these lesions in different age groups. He continues to study aspects of myocardial contraction and coronary blood flow in collaboration with investigators at other institutions."

Hoffman lived in Tiburon, California.
