= Y. S. Chandrashekhar =

American cardiologist

Yellapragada S. Chandrashekhar
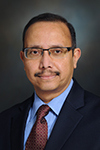
- Born: April 30, 1960 (age 65); Pune, India
- Occupation: Cardiologist

Yellapragada S. Chandrashekhar (born April 30, 1960) is an American cardiologist and Professor of Cardiology at the University of Minnesota. He is also the chief of cardiology at the Minneapolis VA Hospital, an associate editor for the Journal of the American College of Cardiology, and, since March 2017, the editor-in-chief of the Journal of American College of Cardiology: Cardiovascular Imaging Journal. He was one of the first researchers to describe adult subacute mountain sickness.

== Career ==
Chandrashekhar completed medical school in his hometown of Pune, India at the BJ Medical College, Pune. Following that, he spent several years at the Post Graduate Institute in Chandigarh, India, where he published extensively. At the University of Minnesota, he served as assistant professor of medicine in 1998–1999, associate professor from 2000 to 2006, and professor from 2007 until present. Chandrashekhar was chair of the Cardiology Merit Review study section of the VA and is on the scientific and policy advisory committee of the World Heart Federation. He was also an author of the 2015 multimodality imaging guidelines in COCATS 4 and has published extensively in medical journals.

Chandrashekhar is a fellow of the American College of Cardiology.
