= Kian F. Chung =

British respiratory physician and academic

Kian Fan Chung FRCP
- Education: Middlesex Hospital Medical School (University of London)
- Known for: Severe asthma; COPD; bronchitis; cough hypersensitivity
- Awards: Fellow of the Royal College of Physicians (FRCP); Fellow of the European Respiratory Society; Member of Academia Europaea
- Scientific career
- Fields: Respiratory medicine
- Workplaces: Imperial College London; Royal Brompton and Harefield NHS Foundation Trust

Kian Fan Chung is a British respiratory physician and academic. He is Professor of Respiratory Medicine at the National Heart and Lung Institute, Imperial College London, and Honorary Consultant Respiratory Physician at Royal Brompton and Harefield NHS Foundation Trust. Chung is known for his research in severe asthma, chronic obstructive pulmonary disease (COPD), bronchitis, and cough hypersensitivity.

== Education ==
Chung earned his MBBS from Middlesex Hospital Medical School, University of London, in 1975. He became a Member of the Royal College of Physicians (MRCP) in 1977, was awarded his MD in 1983, and received a Doctor of Science (DSc) degree in 2001 from the University of London.

== Career ==
Chung has held academic and clinical positions for over four decades. Since 1996, he has been Professor of Respiratory Medicine at Imperial College London and, since 2002, Head of Experimental Medicine Studies at the National Heart and Lung Institute. He also serves as a Consultant Respiratory Physician at Royal Brompton & Harefield Hospitals.

Chung is a Senior Investigator and now Emeritus Senior Investigator for the UK National Institute for Health Research (NIHR).

== Awards and Honours ==
- Fellow of the Royal College of Physicians (1992)
- Emeritus Senior Investigator, NIHR (2020–present)
- Fellow of the European Respiratory Society (2014)
- Member of Academia Europaea (2022)
