= Foch Hospital =

- Établissement de santé privé d'intérêt collectif
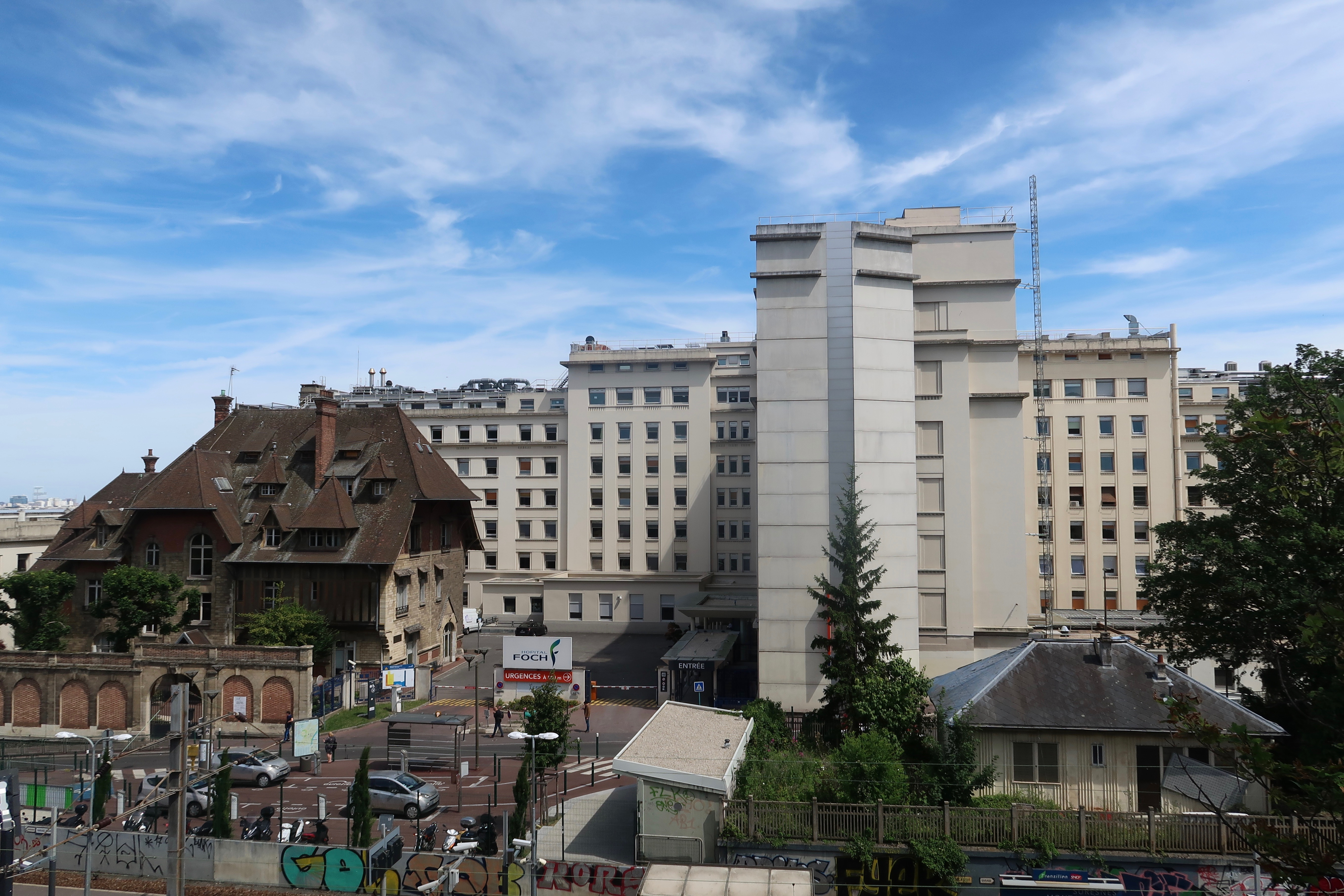

Geography
- Location: Suresnes, Île-de-France, France
- Coordinates: 48.8711063°N 2.222025799999983°E

Organisation
- Care system: Public
- Type: Teaching

Services
- Emergency department: Yes
- Beds: 600

History
- Opened: 1929

Links
- Website: www.hopital-foch.com
- Lists: Hospitals in France

Foch Hospital (French: Hôpital Foch) is a teaching hospital in the commune of Suresnes, France. It is part of the Établissement de santé privé d'intérêt collectif.

It was established in 1929 with the help of Consuelo Vanderbilt and Winnaretta Singer. It was named in honour of Ferdinand Foch.

The hospital is today one of the largest in Île-de-France. The hospital particularly specializes in the areas of pulmonary and respiratory, renal and urological pathologies, as well as neuroscience.

== Partnerships ==
La Foulée suresnoise is a running race dedicated since 2005 to organ donation, in partnership with the Foch hospital. The hospital is also a partner of the University of Versailles Saint-Quentin-en-Yvelines, notably through a research department in transplantation.

== Notable doctors ==
Through its history, the Foch Hospital hosted notable doctors, among others:

- Jozef Cywinski (b. 1936), Polish-American scientist;
- Gilles Dreyfus (b. 1951), French cardiac surgeon;
- Jean-Louis Sebagh, French cosmetic doctor.
