= Health in Monaco =

Monaco has the third highest proportion of doctors for its population in Europe: 581 per 100,000 in 2015.

Infant mortality rate: 1.7 deaths/1,000 live births (2024 estimate)

Life expectancy at birth:
total population: 89.8 years(2024 estimate)
male: 86 years(2024 estimate)
female: 93.7 years (2024 estimate)

== Healthcare ==
The Caisses Sociales de Monaco is the compulsory social insurance scheme in the principality which gives entitlement to the public healthcare system. Employers have to contribute 24% of their gross payroll for healthcare and employees 15% of their earnings. This entitles contributors and their families to reimbursement of between 80% and 100% of the cost of medical procedures, prescriptions, dentistry, rehabilitation, pregnancy and childbirth, and some hospitalizations. French and Italian citizens can use public health facilities if they have contributed to their home country's state health care scheme. The Carte Vitale, which is issued on registration with the Caisses Sociales de Monaco, is used to record administrative, not clinical, information about patients. Patients must register with a doctor employed through the scheme.

Total health expenditure in the country was only about 4% in 2014.

=== Hospitals ===
There are three public hospitals in Monaco:

- Princess Grace Hospital Centre, founded in 1902, 631 beds, public
- Cardiothoracic Center of Monaco, founded in 1987, small hospital, public
- Haemodialysis Centre, public
- Rainier III Centre for Clinical Gerontology
- Monaco Institute for Sports Medicine and Surgery
