= Cardiothoracic Center of Monaco =

Cardiothoracic Centre of Monaco
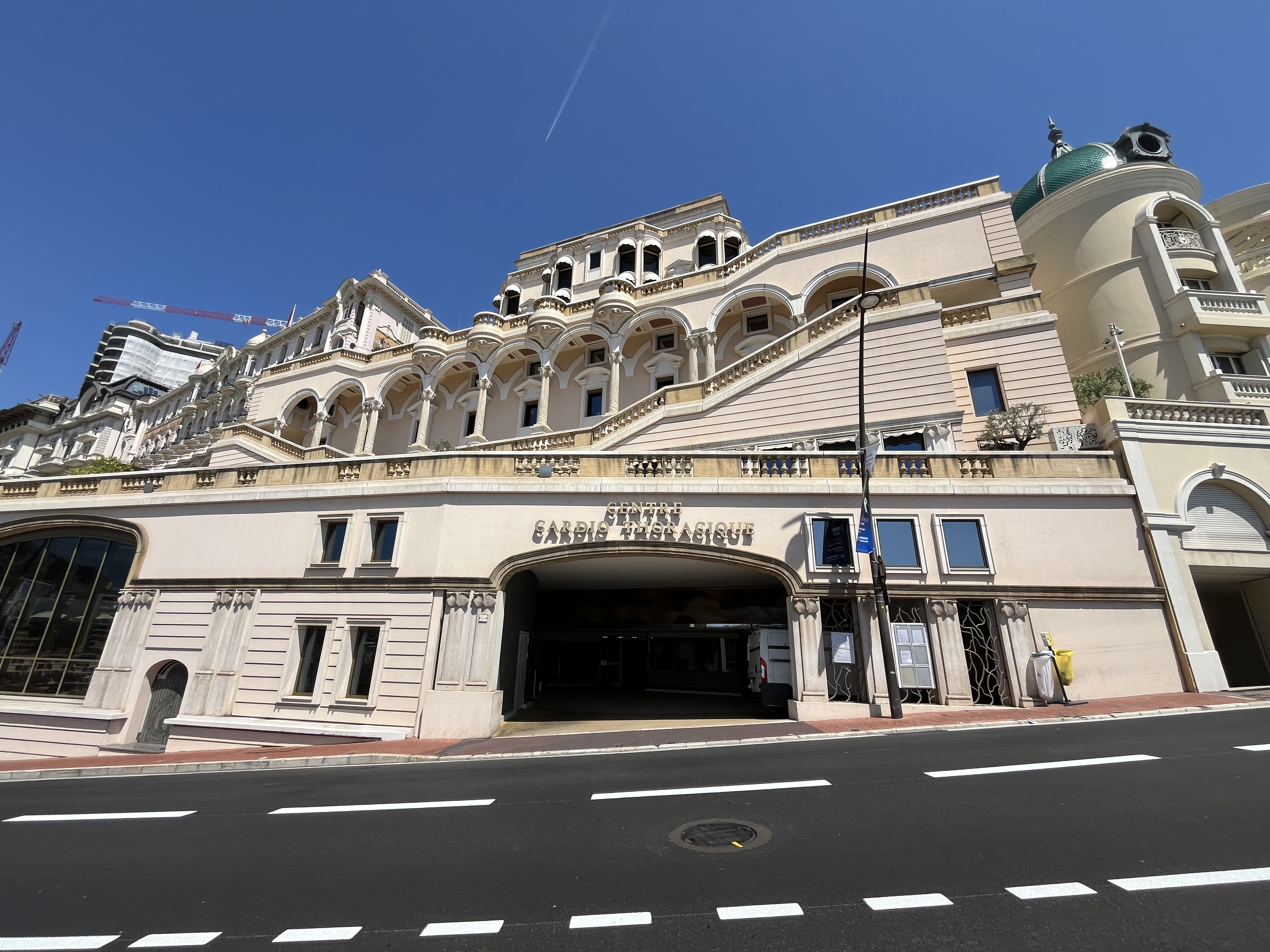

Geography
- Location: Monaco
- Coordinates: 43°44′15.51″N 7°25′29.52″E

Organisation
- Type: Specialist

Services
- Speciality: Cardiothoracic and Thoracic

History
- Opened: 1978

Links
- Website: www.ccm.mc
- Lists: Hospitals in Monaco

The Cardiovascular and Thoracic Centre of Monaco (CCM) is a small hospital in Monaco which specialises in cardiovascular and thoracic diseases.

== History ==
Envisioned in 1978, the Cardiovascular and Thoracic Centre of Monaco opened in April 1987. With support from Monegasque authorities, the CCM was designed to address the shortage of beds in cardiology in the PACA region, but also to offer patients from all around the Mediterranean cutting-edge equipment.

The CCM has been used for humanitarian purposes. In 2010, CCM was nominated by Siemens to be the first Siemens European Reference Center Cardiovascular Medicine.

Prince Rainier III died here on 6 April 2005.
