= Cardiomyoplasty =

Surgical procedure

- ICD-9-CM: 37.67
- MeSH: D018421

Cardiomyoplasty is a surgical procedure in which healthy muscle from another part of the body is wrapped around the heart to provide support for the failing heart. Most often the latissimus dorsi muscle is used for this purpose. A special pacemaker is implanted to make the skeletal muscle contract. If cardiomyoplasty is successful and increased cardiac output is achieved, it usually acts as a bridging therapy, giving time for damaged myocardium to be treated in other ways, such as remodeling by cellular therapies.

== Cellular cardiomyoplasty ==
Cellular cardiomyoplasty is a method which augments myocardial function and cardiac output by directly growing new muscle cells in the damaged myocardium (heart muscle). Tissue engineering, which is now being categorized as a form of regenerative medicine, can be defined as biomedical engineering to reconstruct, repair, and improve biological tissues. Research efforts in tissue engineering have been ongoing and it is emerging as one of the key areas of medical research. Furthermore, there are vast developments in tissue engineering, which involve leveraging of technologies from biomaterials, molecular medicine, biochemistry, nanotechnology, genetic and biomedical engineering for regeneration and cell expansion targets to restructure and/or repair human organs. Injection of cardiomyogenic and/or angiogenic stem cells have been proposed as alternatives to existing treatments. For cardiovascular application, skeletal myoblasts are of great interest as they can be easily isolated and are associated with high proliferation rate. These cells have also been demonstrated to be hypoxia-resistant.

Bone marrow contains different cell populations, which exhibit excellent plasticity toward cardiogenic and endothelial cells. These cell populations are endothelial progenitor cells, hematopoietic stem cells and mesenchymal stem cells. Adipose tissue host progenitor cells with reported interesting cardiomyogenic and vasculogenic potential in the sense that they improve heart functions and reduce infarction size in rodent animal models. Subcutaneous adipose tissue is also a source of mesenchymal stem cells and have demonstrated positive outcomes in terms of cardiovascular tissue remodeling. Mammal hearts also host naturally occurring cardiac stem cells which may be capable of differentiating themselves into cardiomyocytes, endothelial cells and cardiac fibroblasts. This self-regeneration capacity gives rise to alternatives to classical cellular therapies whereby administration of growth factors such as Thymosin β4 for cell activation and migration are solely necessary. Largely democratized in terms of population information, embryonic stem cells are known for their strong capacity for expansion and differentiation into cardiomyocytes, endothelial cells and cardiac fibroblasts.

However, if non autologous, immunosuppression therapy is associated with such treatment. Hence, research has been focused on induced pluripotent stem cells (iPSCs) from somatic human tissue. Further to cell and necessary relevant growth factor selection, cell delivery is an important issue. Indeed, the intracoronary route is the most straightforward cell delivery route as associated with intramyocardial cellular retention; retention rates are however low, i.e. exceed 10%. Washed off cells reach other organs or die, which can be an issue at the time of prepare ICH module 8. Other alternative injection routes have been studied, namely injection via sternotomy, endomyocardial and intracoronary routes. Nevertheless, all methods aforementioned have been associated with limited cardiac function improvements and limited cell survival once implanted in the fibrous myocardium.

To resume, stem cells and delivery routes aforementioned are suitable for cardiomyoplasty as demonstrated safe with some degree of benefit for the patient. However, cardiac remodelling remains limited due to limited cell residency, impact of mechanical forces onto cell survival and tissue hypoxia. Furthermore, lack of cellular electrochemical coupling can lead to arrhythmias. Another point of consideration concerns the use of embryonic stem cells, whereby indifferentiation yields uncontrolled proliferation and possible consequent formation of teratomas. Also iPSCs have been associated with viral infection and eventual oncogenicity. Cardiac tissue engineering is a new technology based on the use of combinations of cells with regenerative capacity, biological and/or synthetic materials, cell signaling agents to induce the regeneration of an organ or damaged tissue. In an ideal scenario, regenerated tissue would reproduce sophisticated asymmetric helicodoidal architecture of the myocardium with the production of specialized extracellular matrix to stimulate vascularization in the implanted tissue. From a cellular perspective, available techniques are monolayer cell construct onto temperature-sensitive polymer, where their detachment is driven by behavior of the mechanical properties of the synthetic support without the need of any enzymatic digestion such as trypsin. Cardiomyocites sheets have also been successfully implanted with an observed contractile function as a result of inter-cellular communication between the host and graft. However, from a practical point of view, such approach lacks of translational character as all studies share the lack of reproducibility, i.e. a construct of similar characteristics of the native tissue does not guarantee the same results. Another approach resides in the use of hydrogels. Natural hydrogels such as Matrigel, collagen and fibrin have been used as entrapment matrices, wherein the cells to be injected are embedded. However the associated high pressure of injection is associated with a high mortality rate for the cells thereby negatively impacting the benefit ratio of this approach. Furthermore, from a technical point of view, due to the polydispersity of these natural hydrogels, purification is a requisite but very difficult step. Synthetic hydrogels, such as polyethylene glycol, polylactic acid, polylactic acid-co-glycolic acid, polycaprolactone, polyacrylamide and polyurethane have been proposed. Metalloproteinase-sensitive polyethylene is of particular interest. Indeed, this polymer modulates its mechanical and biophysical properties accordingly to enzymatic activities associated with cardiomyogenic differentiation of implanted cells. To date, no hydrogel matrix is FDA-approved for stem cell therapy use despite a large number of biomaterials currently commercially available.

A general comment on hydrogel based technologies:

Natural hydrogel are well tolerated by the host and cells due to their mimicking the natural ECM in terms of backbone and microstructure. However they suffer from batch to batch variation (a drawback for current Good Manufacturing Practices (cGMPs) required for clinical application), high degradation rates, and poor tenability. Synthetic hydrogels are reproducible, tunable and amenable regulatory and manufacturing protocols. Their chemical modification permits the integration of cellular attachment sites and a certain control over degradation rates. Semi-synthetic hydrogels share characteristics of both classes. Indeed, they permit either the modification of the purified natural biopolymers or by coupling the synthetic component with integrin and/or growth factor binding sites.
