= The American Journal of Cardiology =

- Discipline: Cardiology, cardiovascular disease
- Language: English
- Edited by: Subhash Banerjee

Publication details
- History: 1958–present
- Publisher: Elsevier
- Frequency: Biweekly
- Impact factor: 2.1 (2024)

Standard abbreviations
- ISO 4: Am. J. Cardiol.

Indexing
- CODEN: AJCDAG
- ISSN: 0002-9149 (print); 1879-1913 (web)
- LCCN: 58041185
- OCLC no.: 00850121

Links
- Journal homepage; Journal page at publisher's website; Online access

The American Journal of Cardiology is a biweekly peer-reviewed scientific journal in the field of cardiology and general cardiovascular disease. The editor-in-chief was William C. Roberts from 1982 to 2022; then he resigned and was replaced by Subhash Banerjee. It supersedes the Transactions of the American College of Cardiology which was published from 1951 to 1957 and the Bulletin of the American College of Cardiology, but it should not be confused with the Journal of the American College of Cardiology.

== Abstracting and indexing ==
The journal is abstracted and indexed in:

- CINAHL
- Current Contents
- EMBASE
- MEDLINE
- Science Citation Index
- Scopus
- Tropical Diseases Bulletin

According to the Journal Citation Reports, the journal has a 2020 impact factor of 2.778, ranking it 80 out of 142 journals in the category "Cardiac & Cardiovascular Systems".
