= Cellular cardiomyoplasty =

Cellular cardiomyoplasty, or cell-based cardiac repair, is a new potential therapeutic modality in which progenitor cells are used to repair regions of damaged or necrotic myocardium. The ability of transplanted progenitor cells to improve function within the failing heart has been shown in experimental animal models and in some human clinical trials. In November 2011, a large group of collaborators at Minneapolis Heart Institute Foundation at Abbott Northwestern found no significant difference in left ventricular ejection fraction (LVEF) or other markers, between a group of patients treated with cellular cardiomyoplasty and a group of control patients. In this study, all patients were post MI, post percutaneous coronary intervention (PCI) and that infusion of progenitor cells occurred 2–3 weeks after intervention. In a study that is currently underway (February 2012), however, more positive results were being reported: In the SCIPIO trial, patients treated with autologous cardiac stem cells post MI have been reported to be showing statistically significant increases in LVEF and reduction in infarct size over the control group at four months after implant. Positive results at the one-year mark were originally reported, however the SCIPIO trial "was recently called into question". Harvard University is "now investigating the integrity of some of the data". The Lancet recently published a non-specific ‘Expression of concern’ about the paper, and then the paper was retracted. Subsequently, another preclinical study also raised doubts on the rationale behind using this special kind of cell, as it was found that the special cells only have a minimal ability in generating new cardiomyocytes. Some specialists therefore now raise concerns to continue.

== Progenitor cell lines ==
To date, the ideal progenitor cells have not been found or created. With the goal of recreating human tissue, the use of embryonic stem cells (ESC) was the initial logical choice. These pluripotent cells can conceptually give rise to any somatic cell line in the human body and while animal studies have shown restoration of cardiac function, immunologic rejection issues and teratoma formation have rendered ESC's a high risk.

Human-induced pluripotent stem cells (iPSCs) are a cell line derived from somatic cells which have been induced through a combination of transcription factors. The iPSC line is very similar or identical to ESCs in many regards and also shows great promise in cardiac potential. This cell line, however, is also less than ideal in that this cell type has been unable to mature into a homogeneous cell culture, making it immunogenic and teratogenic. A third cell line that shows great promise and has no known safety concerns is the adult stem cell derived from bone marrow or from cardiac tissue explants. It has been shown in several studies that adult stem cells do have cardiogenic potential.

== Future direction ==
Presently, the success of adult stem cells in regenerating human myocardium is limited. Three major challenges have been observed. Adult stem cells exhibit a minimal commitment to engraft into the damaged myocardium, they have low survival rates and they have limited proliferation. The positive effects observed in clinical trials today are a result of the work of donated stem cells that persist in the damaged myocardium for just days to weeks after delivery. Clearly, if cell survival is prolonged, these effects could be greatly enhanced. This is where a majority of research is being done today.
