= European Heart Journal: Cardiovascular Imaging =

Medical journal by Oxford University Press

- Discipline: Cardiology
- Language: English
- Edited by: Gerald Maurer

Publication details
- Former name: European Journal of Echocardiography
- History: 2000–present
- Publisher: Oxford University Press
- Impact factor: 9.130 (2021)

Standard abbreviations
- ISO 4: Eur. Heart J.: Cardiovasc. Imaging

Indexing
- ISSN: 2047-2404 (print); 2047-2412 (web)

Links
- Journal homepage

The European Heart Journal: Cardiovascular Imaging is a peer-reviewed medical journal published by Oxford University Press, on behalf of the European Society of Cardiology. The first issue was published in March 2000 with the former name of European Journal of Echocardiography. The journal adopted the current name European Heart Journal: Cardiovascular Imaging in 2012, and is part of the European Heart Journal series of journals.

Published articles present original research on different aspects of cardiovascular imaging in the field of cardiac and coronary CT, MRI, echocardiography, x-ray angiography, ultrasounds and optical imaging. With an impact factor of 6.875 in 2020, it ranked at a high position number among journals in the field of Radiology, Nuclear Medicine & Medical Imaging and it established itself as one of the top cardiovascular journals worldwide.

== Abstracting and indexing ==
The journal is abstracted and indexed in MEDLINE, Science Citation Index, and Scopus.

== See also ==
- European Heart Journal
