= Andrew Nicolaides =

British surgeon (born 1938)

Andrew Nicolaides (Greek: Ανδρέας Νικολαΐδης; born 1938) is a British-Greek Cypriot surgeon, and an expert in cardiovascular disease and stroke prevention.

== Early life ==
Nicolaides was born in 1938 in Nicosia, Cyprus.

He studied medicine at Guy's Hospital Medical School in London. His postgraduate training was at Guy's, the University of Oxford and King's College School of Medicine.

== Career ==
In 1971, he joined the Academic Surgical Unit at St. Mary's Hospital Medical School under Professor Hugh Dudley who was his academic mentor and trained in vascular surgery by Mr. H.H.G. Eastcott. He became senior lecturer and consultant vascular surgeon in 1977, reader in 1980 and was the professor of vascular surgery at Imperial College School of Medicine from 1983 to 2000. In 2000, he returned to Cyprus to become the medical director of the Cyprus Institute of Neurology and Genetics until 2004. He is now Professor Emeritus at Imperial College London, an examiner for MSc and PhD degrees for the University of London and director of the Vascular Screening and Diagnostic Centre in London. He is also a "special scientist" at the University of Cyprus, chairman of the Cyprus Cardiovascular Disease Educational and Research Trust (CCDERT) and medical director of the Vascular Screening and Diagnostic Centre (VSDC) in Cyprus. He has created the first stroke prevention clinic in Cyprus.

== Academic work ==
Nicolaides has undertaken research on venous thromboembolism, noninvasive vascular investigations with particular emphasis on venous disease, the cardiac assessment of the arteriopath and more recently carotid plaque (atheroma) characterisation, identification of patients at increased risk for stroke and stroke prevention.

=== Prevention of venous thromboembolism ===
Nicolaides developed a venographic method that demonstrated the soleal veins consistently and the veins of the calf as the site where the majority of postoperative thrombi start. For this work he was awarded the Jacksonian Prize of the Royal College of Surgeons in 1972. Prevention of such thrombi by avoiding stasis was achieved by the development of the sequential intermittent pneumatic compression device (SCD) by his team in the late 1970s now universally used as an established method in the prevention of venous thromboembolism.

=== Venous disease ===
In the 1980s, Nicolaides developed the first calibrated air-plethysmograph that could measure leg volume during exercise accurately. The measurements of ejection fraction of the calf muscle pump and reflux in ml/s opened the door towards a better understanding and classification of chronic venous disease. The air-plethysmograph has provided valuable information of the circulation of the lower limbs of the astronauts on the Mir Space Station and is now part of the Cardiolab project, a science module for studying the cardio-vascular system in a microgravity environment, which features as a part of the European Physiology Modules (EPM) facility, one of the four laboratories on the Columbus module, attached to the ISS. Nicolaides did the first external venous valvuloplasty in the UK in 1988.

=== Stroke prevention ===
In the mid-1990s, Nicolaides developed the method of normalising ultrasonic vascular images so that reproducible measurements of echodensity and texture can be made.

He was the organiser and coordinator of the multicentre Asymptomatic Carotid Stenosis and Risk of Stroke (ACSRS) prospective natural history study. On the basis of this study and the work on plaque characterisation it has become possible to identify a high risk group of patients with asymptomatic carotid stenosis (5.5% stroke rate per year), but most important has been the identification of a low risk group with an annual stroke risk of less than 1%, that can be spared from unnecessary intervention.

His more recent research is focused on the identification of bio-markers, both biochemical and genetic, that are associated with unstable atherosclerotic plaques. The multidisciplinary approach combining angiography, high-resolution ultrasound, thrombolytic therapy, plaque pathology, histochemistry, coagulation studies, and more recently molecular biology has led to the realisation that carotid plaque rupture is a key mechanism underlying the development of cerebrovascular events.

=== Other academic work and positions held ===
Nicolaides is past president of the International Union of Angiology. and past president of the Section of Measurement in Medicine of the Royal Society of Medicine. He is now chairman of the board of the European Venous Forum Foundation and a founder member. He is editor-in-chief of International Angiology and is on the editorial board of many vascular journals.

While at Imperial he created and ran a MSc course in Vascular Technology and Medicine which was unique in Europe, attracting postgraduate students from all over the world, and supervised over 40 PhD students. He has trained over 200 vascular surgeons who are practising all over the world, ten of which are holding chairs as professors of vascular surgery.

He is the co-author of over 400 original papers and editor of 14 books. He was chairman of the Committee of the American Venous Forum that created the CEAP classification of chronic venous disease. He is the chairman of several international faculties that produce and regularly update guidelines on the Investigation, prevention and management of chronic venous disease, Thrombophilia and Venous Thromboembolism and The prevention of Venous Thromboembolism.

== Publications ==
- Nicolaides A. (1975). Thromboembolism – Aetiology, Advances in Prevention And Management, Mtp. ISBN 978-0-8391-0807-8
- Nicolaides A. & Yao J. (1981). Investigation of Vascular Disorders, Churchill Livingstone. ISBN 978-0-443-08020-3
- Greenhalgh R. et al. (1988). Limb Salvage: An Amputation for Vascular Disease, Saunders (W.B.) Co Ltd. ISBN 978-0-7216-2847-9
- Salmasi A. & Nicolaides A. (1989). Cardiovascular Applications of Doppler Ultrasound, Churchill Livingstone. ISBN 978-0-443-03592-0
- Salmasi A. & Nicolaides A. (1991). Occult Atherosclerotic Disease: Diagnosis, Assessment and Management (Developments in Cardiovascular Medicine), Kluwer Academic Publishers. ISBN 978-0-7923-1188-1
- Cooke E. et al. (1991). Raynaud's Syndrome, Med-Orion Publishing. ISBN 978-9963-592-51-7
- Nicolaides A. & Sumner D. (1991). Investigations of Patients with Deep Vein Thrombosis and Chronic Venous Insufficiency, Med-Orion Publishing. ISBN 978-9963-592-50-0
- Belcaro G. et al. (1993). Laser Doppler, Med-Orion Publishing. ISBN 978-9963-592-53-1
- Bernstein E. et al. (1993). Cerebral Revascularisation, Med-Orion Publishing. ISBN 978-9963-592-54-8
- Bergqvist D. et al. (1994). Prevention of Venous Thromboembolism, Med-Orion Publishing. ISBN 978-9963-592-52-4
- Belcaro G. et al. (1995). Venous Disorders: A Manual of Diagnosis and Treatment, Saunders (W.B.) Co Ltd. ISBN 978-0-7020-2016-2
- Caplan L. et al. (1996). Cerebrovascular Ischaemia Investigation and Management, Med-Orion Publishing. ISBN 978-9963-592-55-5
- Nicolaides A. & Novo S. (1997). Advances in Vascular Pathology (International Congress), Elsevier. ISBN 978-0-444-82833-0
- Myers K. et al. (1997). Lower Limb Ischaemia, Med-Orion Publishing. ISBN 978-9963-592-56-2
- Belcaro G. & Nicolaides A. (1999). The Venous Clinic: Diagnosis, Prevention, Investigations, Conservative and Medical Treatment, Sclerotherapy and Surgery, Imperial College Press. ISBN 978-1-86094-051-4
- Belcaro G. & Nicolaides A. (2000). Noninvasive Investigations in Vascular Disease, Imperial College Press. ISBN 978-1-86094-213-6
- Nicolaides A. (2002). Prevention of Venous Thromboembolism, International Consensus Statement (Guidelines According to Scientific Evidence), Med-Orion Publishing. ISBN 978-9963-592-58-6
