= American Association for Thoracic Surgery =

The American Association for Thoracic Surgery (AATS) is an international association of cardiothoracic surgeons. It was founded in 1917 by the earliest pioneers in the field of thoracic surgery. Headquartered in Fairfax, Virginia, it has over 1,200 members from 35 countries. To be considered for membership, a surgeon must have a proven record of distinction within the field and have made meritorious contributions to the knowledge of cardiothoracic disease and its surgical treatment.

The association publishes the Journal of Thoracic and Cardiovascular Surgery. It fosters the education of young cardiothoracic surgeons by providing scholarships and fellowships, and makes special awards to distinguished members.

Recipients of the association's Scientific Achievement Award include John W. Kirklin (1994), Norman E. Shumway (1998), Michael E. DeBakey (1999), Denton A. Cooley (2000), Alain F. Carpentier (2005), Gerald Buckberg (2007), and Andrew S. Wechsler (2008).

The association's papers are held at the National Library of Medicine.

AATS Graham Foundation has been fostering Careers and developing Leaders ̶ Since 1973. It has continually supported cardiothoracic surgeons worldwide in research and education. In this endeavour, AATS awards several scholarships and Fellowship awards.

Some of the notable awards include - AATS Research Scholarship Award, AATS Surgical Investigator, AATS Advanced Valve Disease Educational Fellowship, AATS Robotic Surgery Fellowship, AATS Thoracic Surgery Fellowship and AATS Graham Traveling Fellowship.
