= Association for the Advancement of Medical Instrumentation =

Medical Organisation

The Association for the Advancement of Medical Instrumentation (AAMI) is an organization for advancing the development, and safe and effective use of medical technology founded in 1965.

== Members ==
More than 7,000 individuals, hospitals, and medical device manufacturers are members of AAMI.
