= Royal Brompton and Harefield NHS Foundation Trust =

Healthcare trust in England

- Type: NHS hospital trust
- Established: 1993
- Disbanded: 2021
- Budget: £316 million
- Hospitals: Royal Brompton Hospital; Harefield Hospital
- Website: https://www.rbht.nhs.uk/

The Royal Brompton and Harefield NHS Foundation Trust was an NHS foundation trust which ran the Royal Brompton Hospital in Kensington and Harefield Hospital in Hillingdon, London, England.

The Trust has been centrally involved in a long running row over attempts to reduce the number of children's heart surgery units in England following the enquiry into deaths of children at Bristol Royal Infirmary. It was agreed in July 2012 to end children's surgery at the Brompton, Leeds and Leicester. after an unsuccessful judicial review action by the Trust. However, in June 2013 Jeremy Hunt suspended this plan and asked NHS England to reconsider and to produce a new report at the end of July(in November 2013).

It was named by the Health Service Journal as one of the top hundred NHS trusts to work for in 2015. At that time it had 3125 full-time equivalent staff and a sickness absence rate of 2.49%. 92% of staff recommend it as a place for treatment and 81% recommended it as a place to work.

The trust merged with Guy's and St Thomas' NHS Foundation Trust which took place in April 2021.

== Private patients ==
About 12% of the trust's income came from private patients in 2014. The Brompton Private Patient Unit has opened an outpatients clinic in Harley Street.

== See also ==
- Healthcare in London
- List of NHS trusts
