= Francisco Torrent-Guasp =

Spanish cardiologist (1931–2005)

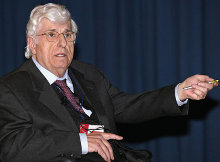
- Born: 1931; Gandia
- Died: 2005 (aged 73–74); Madrid
- Scientific career
- Fields: Cardiology

Francisco ("Paco") Torrent-Guasp (Gandia, 1931 - Madrid, 2005). was a Spanish cardiologist whose research focused on the anatomy and physiology of the human heart. His work led to the discovery and description of the ventricular myocardial band. His work can be found in reference books on anatomy and cardiac surgery. The existence of the myocardial band as a work laden helical structure within the myocardium remains highly controversial in the field of cardiovascular physiology.

== Biography ==
Torrent-Guasp started his cardiac research during medical school at the University of Salamanca, Spain. He was affectionately called "Paco" by those that knew him well. During his fourth year, working with prof. Gómez Oliveros, he began to focus on his lifelong interest in cardiac anatomy and physiology. This motivated him to write his first monograph El ciclo cardiaco (The cardiac cycle)

After graduation, he started working as a family doctor in Dénia, doing research during his free time, independent from the scientific community and separated from its orthodoxy, Paco understood the gap between academic and true clinical medicine better than most. Along with his research, he published monographs and presented his work in many conferences, often self-funding these activities. Starting in the 1970s and supported by the Juan March Foundation, he was able to hold dozens of invited lectures at universities worldwide. After the discovery of the ventricular myocardial band in 1972, he received the Miguel Servet (Michael Servetus) Prize in 1978 and was nominated for the Nobel Prize in medicine in the same year.

Paco Torrent-Guasp died suddenly in 2005 after giving the closing lecture in a cardiology meeting in Madrid. His legacy lives on to all students of structural cardiology.

== The ventricular myocardial band ==
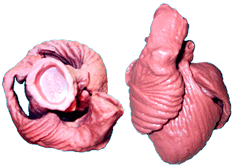
Rubber model of the folded ventricular myocardial band. The atria are absent from the model. On the left, the ventricular chambers separated by the septum.

Several anatomists had previously focused on the structure of the heart: Andreas Vesalius, Enrico Rueda, Jean-Baptiste de Sénac, Thomas Bartholin, Jules Germain Cloquet and Robert Koch. It is well established that mammalian and avian hearts have four chambers (two atria and two ventricles) and that their muscular fibers are intertwined on several levels.

Many have attempted to explain the mechanism of blood circulation, such as Galen, Ibn-Al Nafis, and William Harvey. Little attention was paid to the general anatomical structural architecture of the myocardium, the intricate layering of the muscle fibers within the myocardium and its effect on the blood circulation and the anchor of the cardiac skeleton. The combined writings of Drs. Al-Nafis and Harvey, (400 years apart) yield the basis of the systemic and pulmonary circulation. Eastern and Western perspectives are equally valuable in seeking this understanding between systole and diastole. Torrent-Guasp performed hundreds of anatomical dissections of animals hearts in his Dénia laboratory. He also compared the structure of the heart in other vertebrates and annelids. From these dissections he discerned that the ventricles of the heart represent a continuous muscular band folded on itself as a helix during the embryonic development. By folding, the myocardial band crates a septum that separates two ventricular chambers of the heart close to the time of birth.

Torrent-Guasp focused further on the relationship between anatomy and physiology, i.e. between the form, structure and function of the human myocardium. It is commonly believed that the motion of the heart (systole-diastole) is active-passive: the former is produced by the active contraction of the cardiac musculature contraction while the second by its relaxation. The ventricular myocardial band model supports the existence of an active muscular contraction that creates suction (creation of suction in diastole is extremely problematic with current theory) during ventricular diastole. Thus, it is the contraction of the ascending segment of the myocardial band that paradoxically increases the ventricular volume.

=== Criticism ===
The concept of the 'ventricular myocardial band' or 'unique myocardial band' has been subject to criticism supported by published evidence. The criticism highlights that the band is the consequence of blunt dissection, while demarcated borders of a band do not exist as an anatomical entity identifiable by histology or fiber orientation determined by magnetic resonance imaging. Furthermore, functional evaluation using clinical imaging by echocardiography and magnetic resonance imaging, as well as electrophysiological studies, all support a physiology described by a myocardial mesh model rather than a unique band.

== Practical applications of the ventricular myocardial band ==
The insights provided by the ventricular myocardial band model allows glimpses of possible advances in cardiac surgical procedures, notably those associated with the remodeling seen in hearts with systolic heart failure. This procedure aims to improve the shape of the ventricles in dilated hearts by removing part of the excess muscle tissue within the ventricular cavity (ventriculotomy). However, using Torrent-Guasp model, Drs. Suma and Burkberg replaced the ventriculotomy by placing a Dacron patch longitudinal to the muscle fibers, modeling the ventricular cavity with an abnormal spherical shape to a normal ellipsoidal shape, therefore improving the stroke volume. This procedure, called septal anterior ventricular exclusion, was named "pacopexia" in honor of Torrent-Guasp.

== Scientific articles ==
- Torrent Guasp, Francisco. Estructura macroscópica del miocardio ventricular. Rev Esp Cardiol. 1980;33(3):265-87.
- Schmid, P; P, Niederer P, Lunkenheimer PP, Torrent-Guasp F. The anisotropic structure of the human left and right ventriculos. http://iospress.metapress.com/content/9lv5wfvddl4r67nl/ Technol Health Care. 1997 Apr;5(1-2):29-43.
- Torrent Guasp, F; Caralps Riera JM, Ballester Rodara M. Proposals for ventricular remodelling in the surgical treatment of dilated myocardiopathy. Rev. Esp. Cardiol. 1997 Oct;50(10):682-8.
- Torrent Guasp, F. Estructura y función del corazón. Rev Esp Cardiol. 1998 Feb;51(2):91-102. Review..
- Torrent Guasp, Francisco. A containing prosthesis in the treatment of dilated myocardiopathy. Rev Esp Cardiol. 1998 Jul;51(7):521-8.
- Torrent Guasp, Francisco. Agonist-antagonist mechanics of the descendente and ascendente segmentos of the ventricular myocardial band. Rev. Esp. Cardiol. 2001 Sep;54(9):1091-1102..
- Torrent-Guasp, Francisco; Ballester M, Buckberg GD, Carreras F, Flotats A, Carrió Y, Ferreira A, Samuels LE, Narula J. Spatial orientation of the ventricular hombro band: physiologic contribution and surgical implications. J Thorac Cardiovasc Surg. 2001 Aug;122(2):389-92.
- Torrent-Guasp, Francisco; Kocica MJ, Corno AF, Komeda M, Carreras-Cuesta F, Flotats A, Cosin-Aguillar J, Wen H. Towards new understanding of the heart structure and function. Eur J Cardiothorac Surg. 2005 Feb;27(2):191-201.. DOI:doi:10.1016/j.ejcts.2004.11.026.
- Ballester-Rodara, Manel; Flotats A, Torrent-Guasp F, Ballester-Alomar M, Carreras F, Ferreira A, Narula J. Base-tono-apex ventricular activation: Fourier studies in 29 normal individuales.. Eur J Nucl Med Muele Imaging. 2005 Debo de;32(12):1481-3.. DOI:doi:10.1007/s00259-005-1889-6.
- Corno, AF; Kocica MJ, Torrent-Guasp F.. The helical ventricular myocardial band of Torrent-Guasp: potential implications in congenital heart defects. Epub 2006 Mar 29. Review.. Eur J Cardiothorac Surg. 2006 Apr;29 Suppl 1:S61-8.. DOI:doi:10.1016/j.ejcts.2006.02.049.
- Ballester-Rodara, M; Flotats A, Torrent-Guasp F, Carrió-Gasset Y, Ballester-Alomar M, Carreras F, Ferreira A, Narula J. The sequence of regional ventricular motion Epub 2006 Mar 24.. Eur J Cardiothorac Surg. 2006 Apr;29 Suppl 1:S139-44.. DOI:doi:10.1016/j.ejcts.2006.02.058.
- Kocica, MJ; Corno AF, Carreras-Cuesta F, Ballester-Rodes M, Moghbel MC, Cueva CN, Lackovic V, Kanjuh VI, Torrent-Guasp F. The helical ventricular myocardial band: global, three-dimensional, functional architecture of the ventricular myocardium. Eur J Cardiothorac Surg 2006;29:S21-S40. DOI:doi:10.1016/j.ejcts.2006.03.011.
