= Circulation (journal) =

- Journal cover
- Discipline: Cardiology, cardiovascular medicine
- Language: English
- Edited by: Joseph A. Hill

Publication details
- History: 1950–present
- Publisher: Lippincott Williams & Wilkins (United States)
- Frequency: Weekly
- Open access: Delayed (after 12-month)
- Impact factor: 38.6 (2024)

Standard abbreviations
- ISO 4: Circulation

Indexing
- ISSN: 0009-7322 (print); 1524-4539 (web)
- OCLC no.: 1554748

Links
- Journal homepage

Circulation is a scientific journal published by Lippincott Williams & Wilkins for the American Heart Association. The journal publishes articles related to research in and the practice of cardiovascular diseases, including observational studies, clinical trials, epidemiology, health services and outcomes studies, and advances in applied (translational) and basic research. Its 2021 impact factor is 39.918, ranking it first among journals in the Cardiac and Cardiovascular Systems category and first in the Peripheral Vascular Disease category. Articles become open access after a 12-month embargo period.

2008 saw the appearance of six subspecialty journals. The first edition of Circulation: Arrhythmia and Electrophysiology appeared in April 2008, followed by an edition dedicated to heart failure in May titled Circulation: Heart Failure. The remaining four journals launched once per month from July through October 2008. In order of release they were, Circulation: Cardiovascular Imaging, Circulation: Cardiovascular Interventions, Circulation: Cardiovascular Quality and Outcomes, and Circulation: Cardiovascular Genetics (now published as Circulation: Genomic and Precision Medicine since January 2018).

== Journal ranking summary ==
The following table presents the latest available journal ranking indicators for Circulation according to Scopus and Web of Science metrics.

Journal ranking summary (2023)

Source	Category	Rank	Percentile	Quartile
Scopus	Cardiology and Cardiovascular Medicine in Medicine	3/387	99.22	Q1
Scopus	Physiology (medical) in Medicine	2/113	98.23	Q1
Web of Science (IF)	Cardiac & Cardiovascular Systems	3/220	98.90	Q1
Web of Science (IF)	Peripheral Vascular Disease	1/96	99.50	Q1
Web of Science (JCI)	Cardiac & Cardiovascular Systems	1/220	99.55	Q1
Web of Science (JCI)	Peripheral Vascular Disease	1/96	98.96	Q1

== See also ==
- Journal of the American College of Cardiology
- European Heart Journal
