= European Heart Journal =

- Discipline: Cardiology
- Language: English
- Edited by: Filippo Crea

Publication details
- History: 1980–present
- Publisher: Oxford University Press
- Frequency: 48/year
- Open access: Hybrid
- Impact factor: 45.3 (2025)

Standard abbreviations
- ISO 4: Eur. Heart J.
- NLM: Eur Heart J

Indexing
- CODEN: EHJODF
- ISSN: 0195-668X (print); 1522-9645 (web)
- LCCN: sn79009215
- OCLC no.: 05585193

Links
- Journal homepage; Current issue; Archive

The European Heart Journal is a peer-reviewed medical journal of cardiology published by Oxford University Press on a weekly basis, on behalf of the European Society of Cardiology (ESC). The first issue was published in February 1980.

== Overview ==
The medical journal publishes both clinical and scientific papers on all aspects of cardiovascular medicine. It includes articles related to research findings, technical evaluations, and reviews. In addition, the journal features reviews, clinical perspectives, podcasts, and editorial articles about recent developments in cardiology, and encourages correspondence from its readers. Another important aspect of the journal are the ESC Clinical Practice Guidelines, which cover all areas of cardiology.

The current Impact Factor of the journal is 45.3, ranking it 2nd in the field of cardiology.

Thomas F. Lüscher (Royal Brompton and Harefield Hospital Trust and Universität Zürich) was succeeded by Filippo Crea as the editor-in-chief in September 2020.

== Specialty journals ==
In addition to the European Heart Journal, Oxford University Press publishes several other specialty journals on behalf of the European Society of Cardiology, each focused on a specific modality in cardiology. These journals are:

- Cardiovascular Research
- EP Europace
- European Heart Journal - Acute Cardiovascular Care
- European Heart Journal - Cardiovascular Imaging
- European Heart Journal - Cardiovascular Pharmacotherapy
- European Heart Journal - Case Reports
- European Heart Journal - Digital Health
- European Heart Journal - Imaging Methods and Practice
- European Heart Journal Open
- European Heart Journal - Quality of Care & Clinical Outcomes
- European Heart Journal Supplements
- European Heart Journal - Valvular and Structural Heart Disease
- European Journal of Cardiovascular Nursing
- European Journal of Preventive Cardiology

== See also ==
- European Society of Cardiology
- Journal of the American College of Cardiology
- Circulation
