= Journal of the American College of Cardiology =

- Discipline: Cardiology
- Language: English
- Edited by: Harlan Krumholz

Publication details
- History: 1983–present
- Publisher: Elsevier for the American College of Cardiology
- Frequency: Weekly
- Impact factor: 22.3 (2024)

Standard abbreviations
- ISO 4: J. Am. Coll. Cardiol.

Indexing
- CODEN: JACCDI
- ISSN: 0735-1097 (print); 1558-3597 (web)
- OCLC no.: 08909559

Links
- Journal homepage; Journal page on publisher's website; Online access

The Journal of the American College of Cardiology is a peer-reviewed medical journal covering all aspects of cardiovascular disease, including original clinical studies, translational investigations with clear clinical relevance, state-of-the-art papers, review articles, and editorials interpreting and commenting on the research presented, published by the American College of Cardiology.

== Abstracting and indexing ==
The journal is abstracted and indexed in Current Contents, EMBASE, MEDLINE, Science Citation Index, and Scopus. According to the Journal Citation Reports, the journal has a 2024 impact factor of 22.3.

== Associated journals ==
- JACC: Advances
- JACC: Asia
- JACC: Basic to Translational Science
- JACC: CardioOncology
- JACC: Cardiovascular Imaging
- JACC: Cardiovascular Interventions
- JACC: Case Reports
- JACC: Clinical Electrophysiology
- JACC: Heart Failure

== See also ==
- American Journal of Cardiology
- Circulation
- European Heart Journal
