= American College of Cardiology =

Medical association

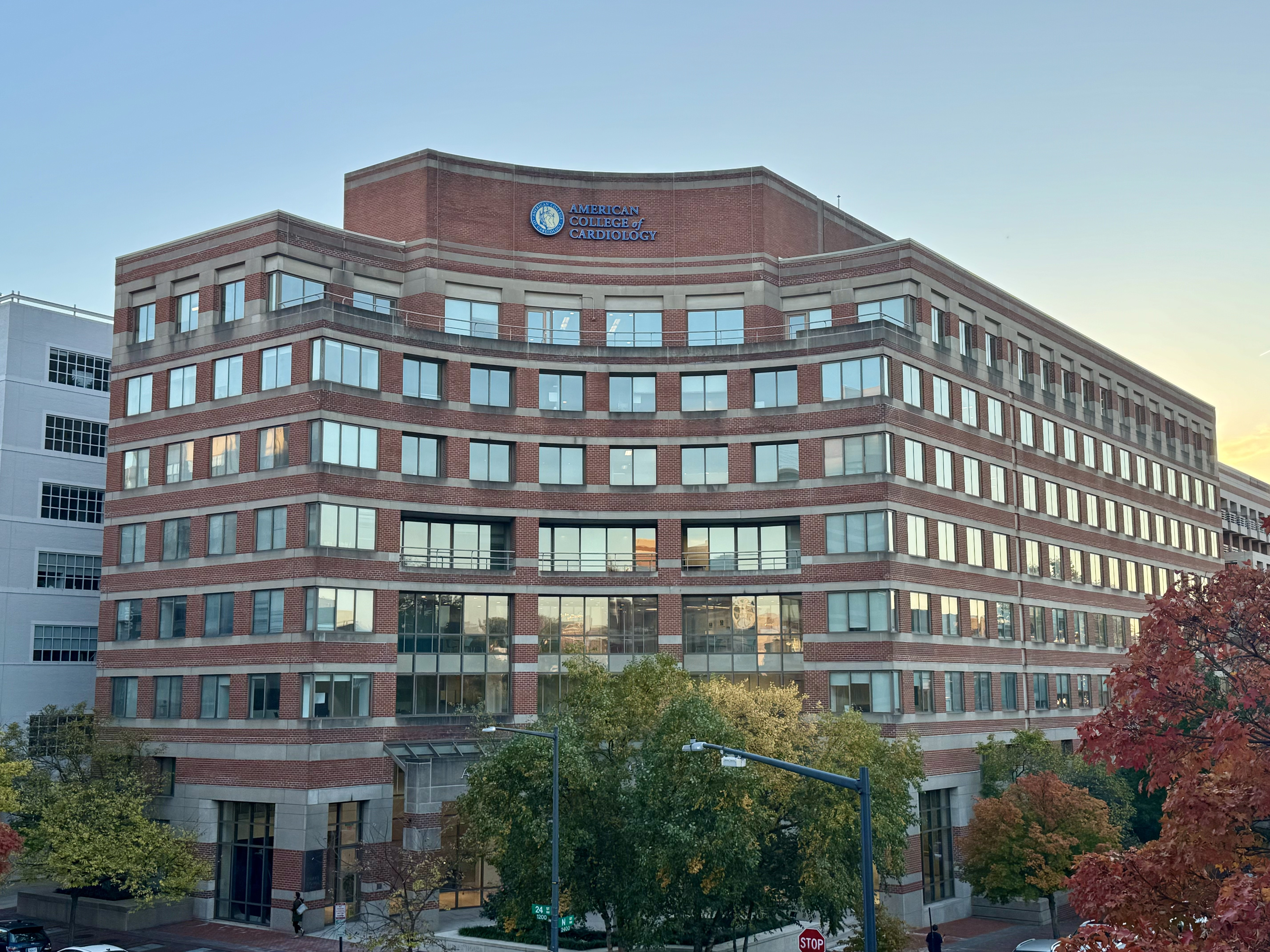
- The American College of Cardiology in 2024
- Established: 1949
- Type: Nonprofit medical association
- Headquarters: 2400 N St NW, Washington, D.C., U.S.
- Coordinates: 38°54′25.24″N 77°3′6.56″W
- Website: acc.org

The American College of Cardiology (ACC), based in Washington, D.C., is a nonprofit medical association established in 1949. It bestows credentials upon cardiovascular specialists who meet its qualifications. Education is a core component of the college, which is also active in the formulation of health policy and the support of cardiovascular research.

== History ==
The American College of Cardiology was chartered and incorporated as a teaching institution in 1949, and established its headquarters, called Heart House, in Bethesda, Maryland, in 1977. In 2006, the college relocated to Washington, D.C.'s West End neighborhood.

Past papers for the institution are held at the National Library of Medicine in Bethesda, Maryland.

== Leadership ==
The college is governed by its officers, including the president, president-elect, vice president, secretary, treasurer, chief executive officer and board of trustees (BOT). The current ACC Board of Trustees consists of 14 college members. The president of ACC leads the board of trustees for a one-year term. Members of the board of governors serve as grassroots liaisons between the local chapters and the college's national headquarters. Athena Poppas, MD, FACC, was the president for 2020–2021. In July 2023, the college announced that Cathleen Biga, MSN, RN, FACC, would assume the role as president for 2024–2025. Roxana Mehran, MD, FACC is the current ACC president.

== Members ==
The American College of Cardiology has approximately 54,000 members, including physicians, registered nurses, clinical nurse specialists, nurse practitioners, physician assistants, doctors of pharmacology and practice administrators, specializing in cardiovascular care. Becoming a fellow of the American College of Cardiology, associate fellow or affiliate member is based on training, specialty board certification, scientific and professional accomplishments and duration of active participation in a cardiovascular related field. At least 75 percent of professional activities must be devoted to the field of cardiovascular disease. Those who have long exposure in field of academics, research and patient care are eligible for the fellowship of this college. The website of ACC has eligibility calculator from which one can find their eligibility score which should be more than 100. Those achieving highest distinction in the field are awarded the title Master of the American College of Cardiology, which is bestowed upon a maximum of three practicing cardiologists each year.

== Chapters ==
The college maintains 48 chapters in the U.S. and Puerto Rico. Chapters are legally distinct entities from national organization and do not share budgets or staffing. Since 2008, national members have automatically become members of a local chapter.

=== Guidelines ===
As early as the 1980s, the college partnered with the American Heart Association to develop the first clinical practice guidelines for cardiovascular practice. In the 1990s, the college used the guidelines to lay the groundwork for studies documenting discrepancies best and actual cardiovascular practices. The college works with national organizations such as the National Heart, Lung and Blood Institute to continually develop and update these guidelines.

=== Performance measures and data standards ===
In 2000, the college partnered with the American Heart Association to begin development and publication of national performance measurement standards and data standards for both inpatient and outpatient care based on the guidelines. Measurement sets include: coronary artery disease, hypertension, heart failure, atrial fibrillation, cardiac rehabilitation, myocardial infarction, primary prevention and peripheral arterial disease. In addition, the college has submitted its measures to the National Quality Forum, with the majority of its measures receiving endorsement as national standards.

The college has also collaborated with specialty societies to undertake the task of developing and publishing clinical data standards. Clinical data standards developed include those for acute coronary syndrome, atrial fibrillation, heart failure and electrophysiology.

=== Appropriate-use criteria ===
The college has published criteria for single-photon emission computed tomography myocardial perfusion imaging (SPECT MPI), computed tomography of the heart and cardiac magnetic resonance imaging, resting transthoracic and transesophageal echocardiography, and coronary revascularization.

=== Data registries ===
The college's National Cardiovascular Data Registry is a source for measuring and quantifying outcomes and identifying gaps in the delivery of quality care. Its data are used in select pay-for-reporting and/or performance programs to demonstrate the benefits and challenges of such incentive programs. To date, the college has developed eight hospital-based cardiovascular registries. In addition, the PINNACLE Registry is the nation's first and largest practice-based cardiovascular registry. In 2011, the college and The Society of Thoracic Surgeons launched the STS/ACC TVT Registry, which tracks transcatheter valve therapy procedures.

=== National quality initiatives ===
Currently several key quality initiatives are underway to help translate science into practice and improve outcomes for cardiovascular patients. These projects include the Door to Balloon Alliance, Hospital to Home and Imaging in FOCUS.

Launched in November 2006, the Door to Balloon Alliance is focused on helping hospital not only reduce, but successfully sustain the guideline-recommended time of 90 minutes or less from the time a patient with chest pain arrives at an emergency room until they have a balloon dilatation procedure. The alliance provides hospitals with the evidence-based strategies and resources to focus on process improvement, interdisciplinary cooperation and coordination to substantially impact their door-to-balloon times, and thus, improve patient outcomes.

The hospital to Home initiative, led by both the American College of Cardiology and the Institute for Healthcare Improvement, is a national quality improvement campaign to reduce cardiovascular-related hospital rehospitalizations and improve the transition from inpatient to outpatient status for individuals hospitalized with cardiovascular disease. Launched in 2009, it seeks to examine and address readmission problems.

Imaging in FOCUS is a community designed to guide implementation of appropriate use criteria and ensure patients are receiving the right care at the right time; the initiative has produced innovations such as pocket cards and mobile applications; access to an online community; and access to webinars, educational programs and performance improvement tools.

=== Education and advocacy ===
The American College of Cardiology Foundation offers a variety of educational programs and products tailored to the needs of clinicians in a variety of specialty areas at all stages of their careers.

The college also advocates for health policies that allow cardiovascular professionals to provide quality, appropriate and cost-effective care on such issues as Medicare physician payment, medical imaging, health care reform implementation, medical liability reform and funding for prevention and research. The college is also active on policies that address non-communicable diseases.

The college also publishes a peer-reviewed scientific journal Journal of the American College of Cardiology with a high impact factor.

The college organizes an annual conference for each year for sharing the latest research in the field of cardiology. The college cancelled its flagship conference for the first time since inception of the college for the year 2020 in light of the COVID-19 pandemic.

== See also ==
- American Heart Association
