= F90 =

F90 or F-90 may refer to:

== Science and technology ==
- Alacrite, a cobalt-based alloy also known as F90
- Beechcraft King Air F90, a twin engine turboprop airplane
- BMW M5 (F90), a 6th generation of high performance variant of the BMW 5 Series
- Conventional farad, a unit of measurement, symbol F_{90}
- Fortran 90, a computer programming language
- Hyperkinetic disorder (ICD-10 code)
- Nikon F90, a 35mm SLR camera
  - Nikon F90x, an upgraded version of the above

== Military ==
- Lockheed XF-90
- F90 assault rifle, an assault rifle by Thales Australia, a development of the Steyr AUG assault rifle
