= Cobalt-chrome =

Alloy of cobalt and chromium used in medical implants

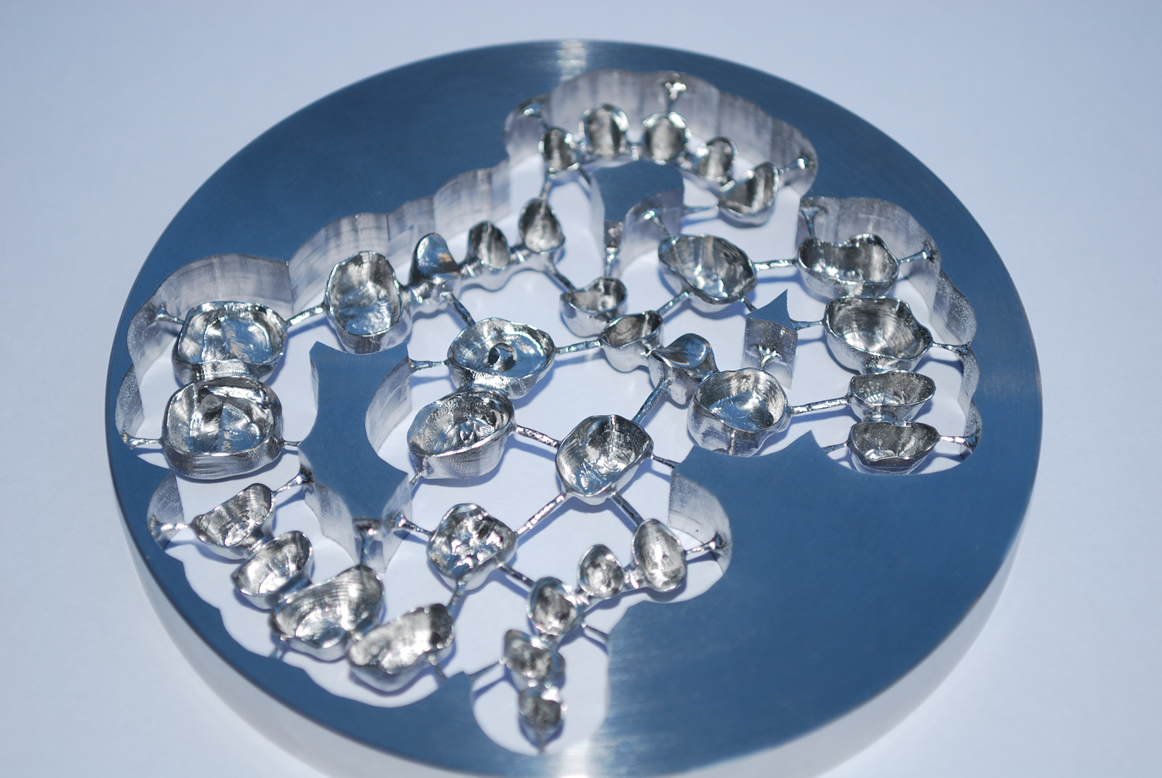
Cobalt-chrome disc with dental bridges and crowns manufactured using WorkNC Dental

Cobalt-chrome or cobalt-chromium (CoCr) is a metal alloy of cobalt and chromium. Cobalt-chrome has a very high specific strength and is commonly used in gas turbines, dental implants, and orthopedic implants. The cast form of the Co-28Cr-6Mo alloy is specified in ASTM F75, while the wrought form used for higher-strength implant components is covered by ASTM F1537 and the equivalent ISO 5832-12. The manufacturing route strongly influences the alloy's microstructure and, in turn, its corrosion resistance and biocompatibility: casting produces a relatively coarse carbide network, whereas wrought, powder-metallurgy and additive-manufacturing processes yield finer and more uniformly distributed carbides, which have been associated with improved corrosion behaviour in the physiological environment.

== History ==
Co-Cr alloy was first discovered by Elwood Haynes in the early 1900s by fusing cobalt and chromium. The alloy was first discovered with many other elements such as tungsten and molybdenum in it. Haynes reported his alloy was capable of resisting oxidation and corrosive fumes and exhibited no visible sign of tarnish even when subjecting the alloy to boiling nitric acid. Under the name Stellite, Co-Cr alloy has been used in various fields where high wear-resistance was needed including aerospace industry, cutlery, bearings, and blades.

Co-Cr alloy started receiving more attention as its biomedical application was found. In the 20th century, the alloy was first used in medical tool manufacturing, and in 1960, the first Co-Cr prosthetic heart valve was implanted, which happened to last over 30 years showing its high wear-resistance. Recently, due to excellent resistant properties, biocompatibility, high melting points, and incredible strength at high temperatures, Co-Cr alloy is used for the manufacture of many artificial joints including hips and knees, dental partial bridge work, gas turbines, and many others.

== Synthesis ==
The common Co-Cr alloy production requires the extraction of cobalt and chromium from cobalt oxide and chromium oxide ores. Both of the ores need to go through reduction process to obtain pure metals. Chromium usually goes through aluminothermic reduction technique, and pure cobalt can be achieved through many different ways depending on the characteristics of the specific ore. Pure metals are then fused together under vacuum either by electric arc or by induction melting. Due to the chemical reactivity of metals at high temperature, the process requires vacuum conditions or inert atmosphere to prevent oxygen uptake by the metal. ASTM F75, a Co-Cr-Mo alloy, is produced in an inert argon atmosphere by ejecting molten metals through a small nozzle that is immediately cooled to produce a fine powder of the alloy.

However, synthesis of Co-Cr alloy through the method mentioned above is very expensive and difficult. Recently, in 2010, scientists at the University of Cambridge have produced the alloy through a novel electrochemical, solid-state reduction technique known as the FFC Cambridge Process which involves the reduction of an oxide precursor cathode in a molten chloride electrolyte.

=== Laser powder bed fusion ===
Laser powder bed fusion (LPBF) has been investigated as an alternative manufacturing route for Co-Cr dental alloys, offering the ability to produce complex geometries directly from powder feedstock. Studies on the EOS Co-Cr SP2 alloy have shown that LPBF process parameters — particularly laser power, scanning speed, and base plate preheating temperature — significantly influence the resulting microstructure, porosity, hardness, and tensile properties. Optimised parameter sets can produce Co-Cr dental components with mechanical properties exceeding those of conventionally cast counterparts, while maintaining the corrosion resistance required for intraoral applications.

== Properties ==
Co-Cr alloys show high resistance to corrosion due to the spontaneous formation of a protective passive film composed of mostly Cr_{2}O_{3}, and minor amounts of cobalt and other metal oxides on the surface. CoCr has a melting point around 1,330 °C (2,430 °F).

As its wide application in biomedical industry indicates, Co-Cr alloys are well known for their biocompatibility. Biocompatibility also depends on the film and how this oxidized surface interacts with physiological environment. Good mechanical properties that are similar to stainless steel are a result of a multiphase structure and precipitation of carbides, which increase the hardness of Co-Cr alloys tremendously. The hardness of Co-Cr alloys varies ranging 550-800 MPa, and tensile strength varies ranging 145-270 MPa. Moreover, tensile and fatigue strength increases radically as they are heat-treated. However, Co-Cr alloys tend to have low ductility, which can cause component fracture. This is a concern as the alloys are commonly used in hip replacements. In order to overcome the low ductility, nickel, carbon, and/or nitrogen are added. These elements stabilize the γ phase, which has better mechanical properties compared to other phases of Co-Cr alloys.

== Common types ==
There are several Co-Cr alloys that are commonly produced and used in various fields. ASTM F75, ASTM F799, ASTM F1537 are Co-Cr-Mo alloys with very similar composition yet slightly different production processes, ASTM F90 is a Co-Cr-W-Ni alloy, and ASTM F562 is a Co-Ni-Cr-Mo-Ti alloy.

== Structure ==
Depending on the percent composition of cobalt or chromium and the temperature, Co-Cr alloys show different structures. The σ phase, where the alloy contains approximately 60–75% chromium, tends to be brittle and subject to a fracture. FCC crystal structure is found in the γ phase, and the γ phase shows improved strength and ductility compared to the σ phase. FCC crystal structure is commonly found in cobalt rich alloys, while chromium rich alloys tend to have BCC crystal structure. The γ phase Co-Cr alloy can be converted into the ε phase at high pressures, which shows a HCP crystal structure.

== Uses ==
=== Jewelry making ===
Co-Cr alloy is very commonly used in fashion industry to make jewellery, especially wedding bands.

=== Medical implants ===
Co-Cr alloys are most commonly used to make artificial joints including knee and hip joints due to high wear-resistance and biocompatibility. Co-Cr alloys tend to be corrosion resistant, which reduces complication with the surrounding tissues when implanted, and chemically inert that they minimize the possibility of irritation, allergic reaction, and immune response. Co-Cr alloy has also been widely used in the manufacture of stent and other surgical implants as Co-Cr alloy demonstrates excellent biocompatibility with blood and soft tissues as well. The alloy composition used in orthopedic implants is described in industry standard ASTM-F75: mainly cobalt, with 27 to 30% chromium, 5 to 7% molybdenum, and upper limits on other important elements such as less than 1% each of manganese and silicon, less than 0.75% iron, less than 0.5% nickel, and very small amounts of carbon, nitrogen, tungsten, phosphorus, sulfur, boron, etc.

Besides cobalt-chromium-molybdenum (CoCrMo), cobalt-nickel-chromium-molybdenum (CoNiCrMo) is also used for implants. The possible toxicity of released Ni ions from CoNiCr alloys and also their limited frictional properties are a matter of concern in using these alloys as articulating components. Thus, CoCrMo is usually the dominant alloy for total joint arthroplasty.

=== Dental prosthetics ===
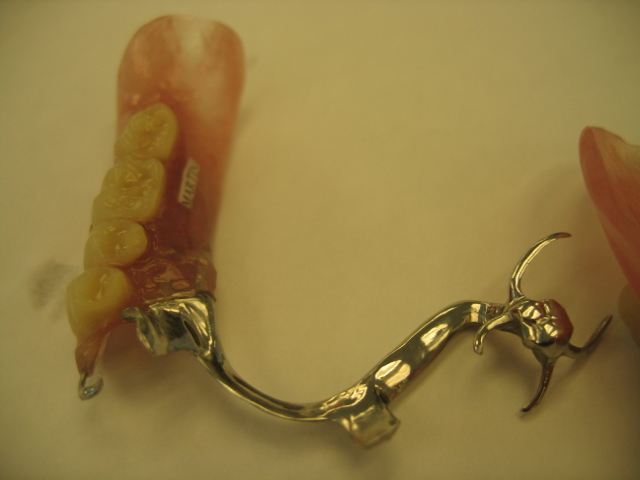
A Co-Cr partial denture.

Co-Cr alloy dentures and cast partial dentures have been commonly manufactured since 1929 due to lower cost and lower density compared to gold alloys; however, Co-Cr alloys tend to exhibit a higher modulus of elasticity and cyclic fatigue resistance, which are significant factors for dental prosthesis. The alloy is a commonly used as a metal framework for dental partials. A well known brand for this purpose is Vitallium. Cobalt-chromium alloys are increasingly processed by laser powder bed fusion (LPBF) for dental prosthetics, including crowns, bridges, and removable partial denture frameworks, offering improved dimensional accuracy and reduced manufacturing time compared to conventional lost-wax casting.

=== Industry ===
Due to mechanical properties such as high resistance to corrosion and wear, Co-Cr alloys (e.g., Stellites) are used in making wind turbines, engine components, and many other industrial/mechanical components where high wear resistance is needed.

Co-Cr alloy is also very commonly used in fashion industry to make jewellery, especially wedding bands.

== Hazards ==
Metals released from Co-Cr alloy tools and prosthetics may cause allergic reactions and skin eczema. Prosthetics or any medical equipment with high nickel mass percentage Co-Cr alloy should be avoided due to low biocompatibility, as nickel is the most common metal sensitizer in the human body.

== See also ==
- Alacrite
- Hastelloy
