= M. S. Valiathan =

Indian cardiac surgeon (1934–2024)

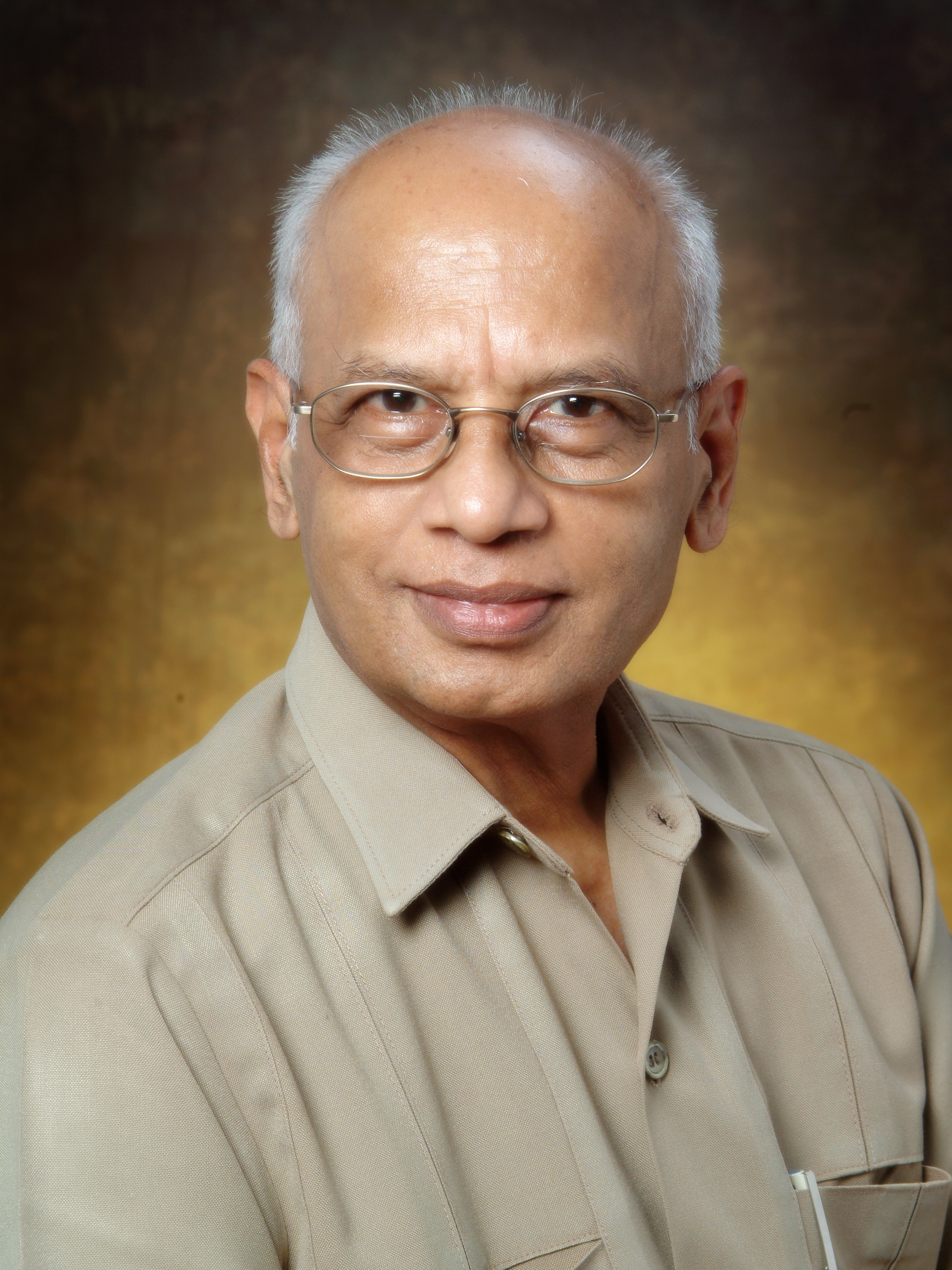
- Valiathan in 2006
- Born: Marthanda Varma Sankaran Valiathan; 24 May 1934; Mavelikara, Travancore, India
- Died: 17 July 2024 (aged 90); Manipal, Karnataka, India
- Education: University of Kerala; University of Liverpool; Johns Hopkins School of Medicine
- Occupation: Cardio-thoracic surgeon
- Spouse: Ashima
- Children: 2

Marthanda Varma Sankaran Valiathan (24 May 1934 – 17 July 2024) was an Indian cardiac surgeon. He was a president of the Indian National Science Academy and a National Research Professor of the Government of India.

Valiathan was awarded the Padma Vibushan in 2005 for his contributions to health technology in India. He was made a Chevalier in the Ordre des Palmes académiques, an honour bestowed by France, in 1999. He received the Dr. Samuel P. Asper International Award from the Johns Hopkins School of Medicine in 2009 for his contributions to international medical education.

== Early life and education ==
He was born on 24 May 1934 at Mavelikkara, Travancore (in present-day Alappuzha district), to Marthanda Varma and Janaki Varma. His early education was at a government school in Mavelikkara, followed by the University College, Thiruvananthapuram. Valiathan's medical education took place at the Government Medical College, Thiruvananthapuram, where he obtained his MBBS (1951–56). He later went to the University of Liverpool as a surgical trainee and received his fellowship from the Royal College of Surgeons of Edinburgh and England in 1960 and master's degree in surgery from the University of Liverpool. After a brief stint as a faculty member at the PGIMER Chandigarh, he underwent further training in cardiac surgery at the Johns Hopkins, George Washington, and Georgetown University Hospitals and became a Fellow of the Royal College of Physicians and Surgeons of Canada in 1970. He worked as a Fellow of Doctors Vincent L. Gott at the Hopkins and Charles A. Hufnagel at the Georgetown University.

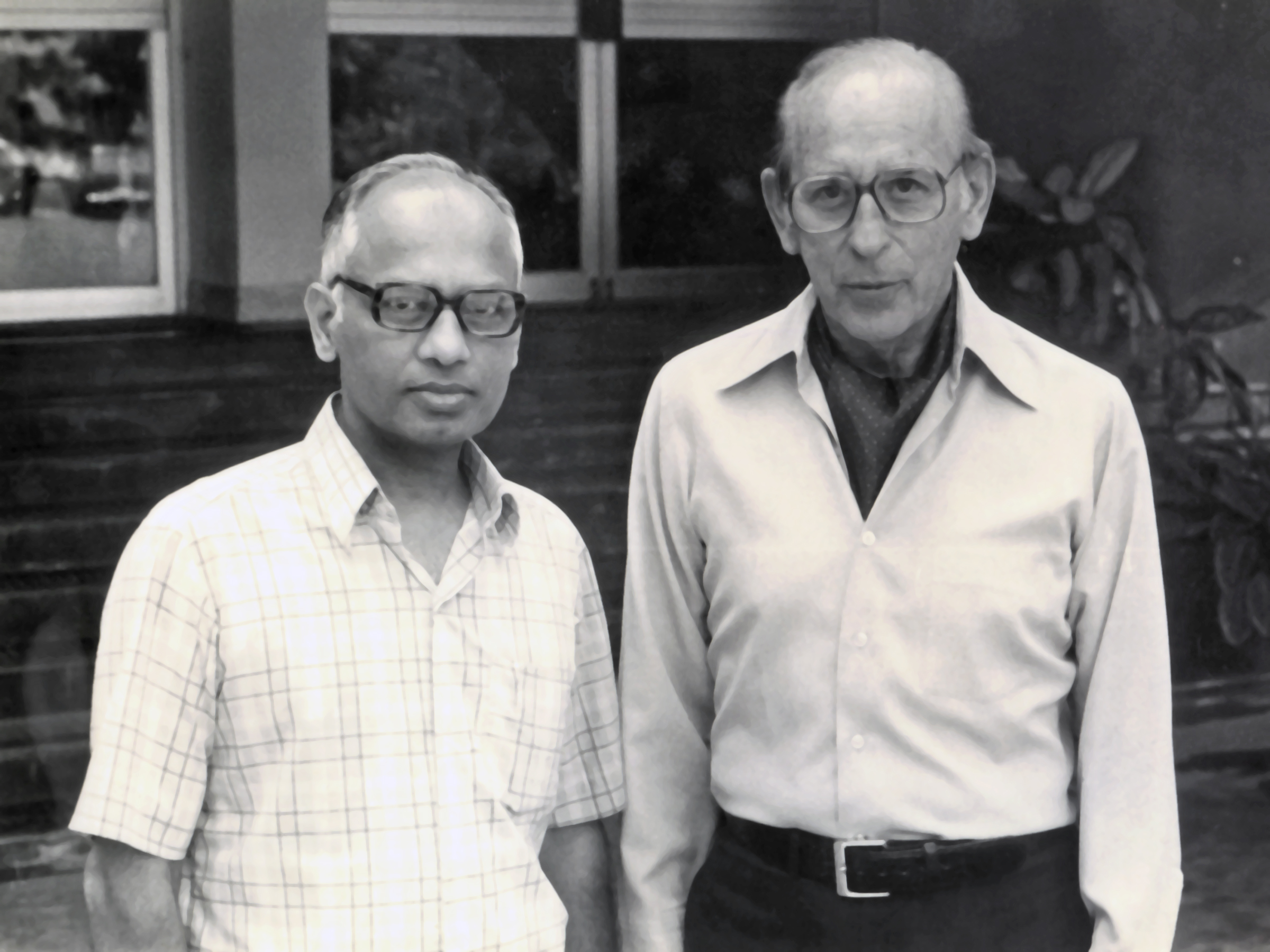
Valiathan with his mentor Charles A. Hufnagel

== Academic career ==
Valiathan served on the faculty of the Georgetown University Hospital, PGIMER, IIT Madras and as director of SCTIMST. Subsequently, Valiathan became the first Vice-Chancellor of Manipal University in 1994.

=== Chitra valve development ===
In the first model, the major and minor struts were electron-beam welded and the valve was expected to withstand 360 million cycles of disc movement. Unfortunately, the major strut fractured at the weld after a mere 100,000 cycles due to weld embrittlement. In the second model, the disk was made of single crystal of sapphire which was inert and blood-compatible. The housing was carved out of a block of titanium. This model failed as well because of extensive wear of titanium struts and the escape of the disc. The third model had a housing made of a highly wear-resistant superalloy, "Haynes-25", a cobalt-based alloy of chromium, nickel and tungsten. This model went through all the tests successfully and several sheep with the implanted valve were alive and well for months until the death of one animal at 3 months after valve implantation. Necropsy showed that the sapphire disc had fractured and caused the death of the animal. This was a major setback in the quest for a cheap, locally made heart valve.

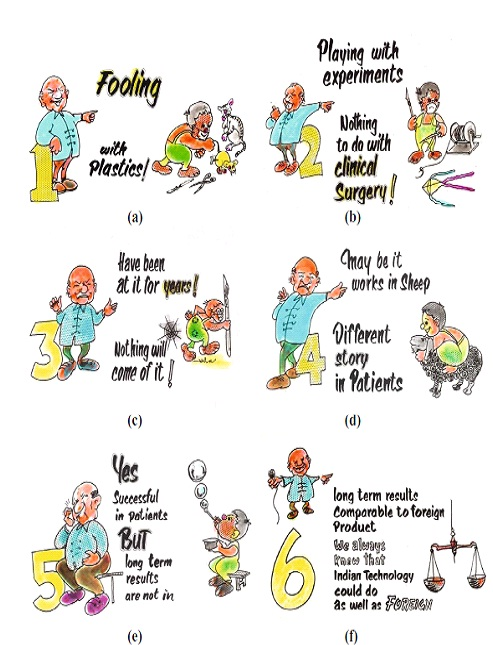
Chitra valve development- changing perception of intelligentsia

However the fourth model was a success and more than 100,000 valves have been implanted in patients (until 2016).The multidisciplinary team at the Sree Chitra Institute led by Valiathan also developed a vascular graft and a series of disposable devices such as blood bags, oxygenators and cardiotomy reservoirs, which are in commercial production in industrial units in Kerala and Tamil Nadu.

=== Vice Chancellor ===
After about twenty years at Sri Chitra, Valiathan became the vice-chancellor of the newly set up Manipal University (then MAHE, Manipal Academy of Higher Education). He held this office until 1999.

=== Books on Ayurvedia pioneers ===
In the year 1999, he was awarded a Senior Fellowship by the Homi Bhabha Council to pursue a study of Caraka, which culminated in the publication of the book "The Legacy of Caraka". Later on, as a National Research Professor, he carried out a study of Sushruta and Vagbhata and completed the series of Legacy volumes on the 'Great Three' of Ayurveda.

In an interview, Valiathan had observed, "At this time there is no common ground where physicists, chemists, immunologists and molecular biologists can interact with Ayurvedic physicians. Ayurveda is not only the mother of medicine but also of all life sciences in India. In spite of it, science has been completely divorced from Ayurveda... But these are the interdisciplinary areas where advances will take place". Earlier in another article, he had written, "To ignore the testimony of thousands of patients over many decades is reminiscent of the derisive attitude of Edward Jenner's contemporaries in Gloucestershire who despised the claim of milkmaids that cow pox gave them protection from small pox! When Jenner wrote to his mentor John Hunter on the observed facts and the arguments against it, Hunter gave his reply, "Why think? Why not experiment?". That applies to Ayurveda whose time to experiment has arrived.

=== Research in basic sciences ===
Based on ideas and practices from Ayurveda, Valiathan promoted study in the basic sciences. The government is financing in "A Science Initiative in Ayurveda" (ASIIA) for research at eminent institutes. In his report, during the seventeenth meeting of the Scientific Advisory Committee to the Cabinet (SAC-C) in 2009, under the Chairmanship of R. Chidambaram, Principal Scientific Adviser to the Government of India, Valiathan lauded the support of the Indian government while presenting an update on ongoing projects. ASIIA made good progress and has been taken over by the Department of Science and Technology, Government of India, for sustained support under a "Task Force in Ayurvedic Biology", which appears on the SERB website. He also gave a course of video lectures on The Ayurvedic Inheritance of India under the NPTEL programme of the IITs of India. These lectures provided the material for his book Ayurvedic Inheritance; A Reader's Companion published by Manipal University Press in 2017.

== Death ==
Valiathan died at a hospital in Manipal, India on 17 July 2024, at the age of 90.

== Awards and honours ==
Valiathan's contributions to medical sciences and technology brought him many honours and awards such as the Fellowships of the IAS, INSA New Delhi, NAS India, NAMS, INAE, The World Academy of Sciences, American College of Cardiology, the Royal College of Physicians of London and the International Union of Societies of Biomaterials and Engineering. He was a "Hunterian Professor" of the Royal College of Surgeons of England and a Senior Member of the Society of Thoracic Surgeons of the United States and the Society of Cardiothoracic Surgeons of Great Britain. The French Government honoured him by making him a Chevalier in the order of Palmes Académiques. He was a recipient of many Awards for Science, Technology and Education, which include the R.D. Birla Award, O.P. Bhasin Award, Jawaharlal Nehru Award, Dhanwantari Prize, Aryabhata medal, Basanti Devi Amirchand Prize, J.C. Bose medal, Kerala State Science and Technology Award, B.C. Guha Award, Pinnamaneni Foundation Award, Sat Pal Mittal Award, G.M. Modi Award, M. V. Pylee Award, H.K. Firodia Award and the Sastra Puraskaram of the Kerala Government. He received the Dr. Samuel P. Asper International Award from the Johns Hopkins University for his contributions to medical education.

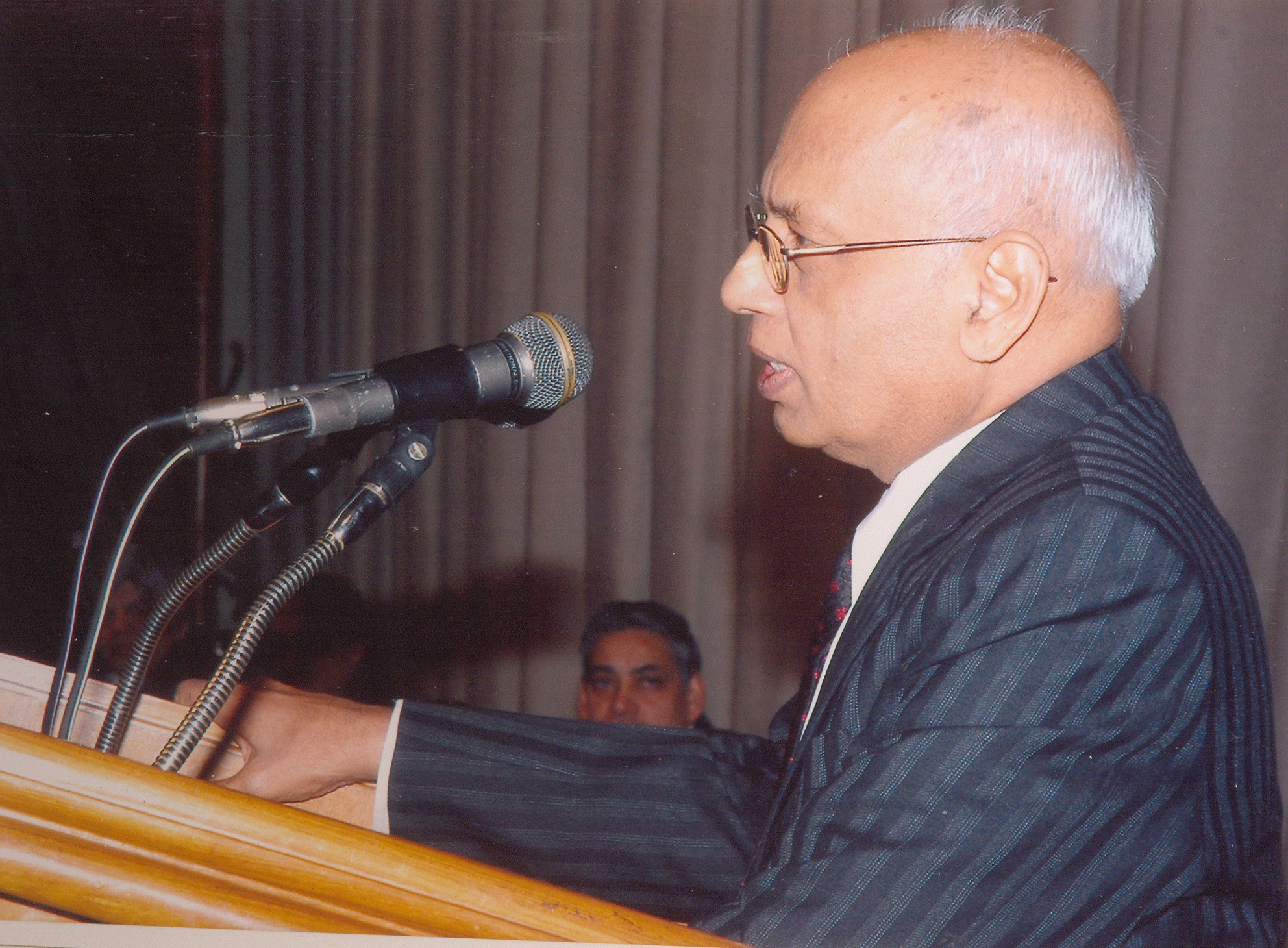
M.S.Valiathan

The SASTRA-Mahamana Award in recognition for his contributions to Indian Knowledge Systems was presented on 28 February 2023 as part of SASTRA National Science Day Awards.

Valiathan served on numerous Government committees and academic councils which pertain to education, medicine, science and technology. These include, among many others, the University Grants Commission, Indian Council of Medical Research, Science and Engineering Research Council of the DST, Atomic Energy Regulatory Board and the Science Advisory Committee to the Cabinet. He was the Chairman of the Committee on Bioethics of the Indian Council of Medical Research and was previously the Chairman of the State Committee for Science, Technology and Environment of the Government of Kerala. He was a past President of the Association of Indian Universities.

Valiathan received numerous honorary degrees, fellowships and awards:

- Honorary Fellow, Kerala Academy of Sciences
- Padma Vibhushan in 2005.
- Padma Bhushan in 1990
- JNTBGRI, Trivandrum named a new hybrid in their Orchid Breeding Programme Paphiopedilum M S Valiathan in his honour. Paphiopedilum M S Valiathan is registered with the International Register of Orchid Hybrids ( Sander's list ) 114:1270 ( July — Aug 2006)
- A new R & D facility named M S Valiathan Medical Devices Engineering Block was inaugurated by Union Minister Dr Harsh Vardhan at the Sree Chitra Institute, Trivandrum on 16 May 2015

== Bibliography ==
- Valiathan, M. S. (1993). "Endomyocardial Fibrosis". The National Medical Journal of India. 6 (5). Oxford University Press: 212–216. PMID 7694719.
- Valiathan, M. S. (2003). The Legacy of Caraka. Orient Longman. ISBN 81-250-2505-7.
- Valiathan, M. S. (2005). Charakapaithrikam. (Tr. into Malayalam of Legacy of Caraka). DC Books. ISBN 81-264-1072-8.
- Valiathan, M. S. (2007). The Legacy of Susruta (Tr. into Malayalam of Legacy of Susruta by Dr. K. Muthulakshmy). Orient Longman. ISBN 978-81-250-3150-5.
- Valiathan, M. S. (2010). Susrutha Paithrukam.(Tr. into Malayalam of Legacy of Susruta). DC Books. ISBN 978-81-264-2527-3.
- Valiathan, M. S. (2010). The Legacy of Vagbhata. Universities Press. ISBN 978-81-737-1668-3.
- Valiathan, M. S. (2012). An Introduction to Ayurveda. Universities Press. ISBN 978-81-7371-827-4.
- Valiathan, M. S. (2012) Vagbhata Paithrukam. (Tr. into Malayalam of Legacy of Vagbhata). DC Books. ISBN 978-81-264-3890-7, OL 41448298M
- Valiathan, M. S. (2017) Ayurvedic Inheritance-A Reader's Companion. Manipal University Press. ISBN 978-93-82460-58-9
