= Pulse duplicator =

Medical testing tool

A simplified diagram of one common pulse duplicator design. A piston is used to create and release pressure, simulating blood flow. Note that both valves would not be fully open at the same time in actual operation.

A pulse duplicator is a device used to duplicate the pulsing flow of the human heart and the associated hemodynamics. It is used to research the conditions of heart disease. Pulse duplicators can be used to conduct in vitro or ex vivo testing. Common uses include testing new artificial heart valves and simulating procedures like transcatheter aortic valve replacement.

== Design ==
A pulse duplicator replicates parts of the circulatory system. Many pulse duplicators model only half the heart, commonly the left atrium and ventricle, in order to test the mitral and aortic valves.

A common design to model the heart uses a piston to simulate the contraction and expansion of the heart. An alternate design uses a flexible plastic heart model, or an ex vivo heart, and applies hydraulic pressure to induce contraction and expansion.

The circulatory system blood vessels are typically modeled using tubing. Compliance chambers and narrow tubing can be used to model the Windkessel effect.

A pulse duplicator is categorized as a lump parameter model, also known as a Windkessel model, if it uses a limited set of compliance chambers and resistance tubing to model the sum of circulatory compliance and resistance. A pulse duplicator is a wave propagation model if it physically replicates the circulatory system in a more anatomically correct manner.

A pulse duplicator is filled with a fluid with a similar viscosity and specific gravity compared to blood. One such blood analog is a mixture of water, glycerol, and a small amount of sodium chloride.
