= Artificial heart valve =

Replacement of a valve in the human heart

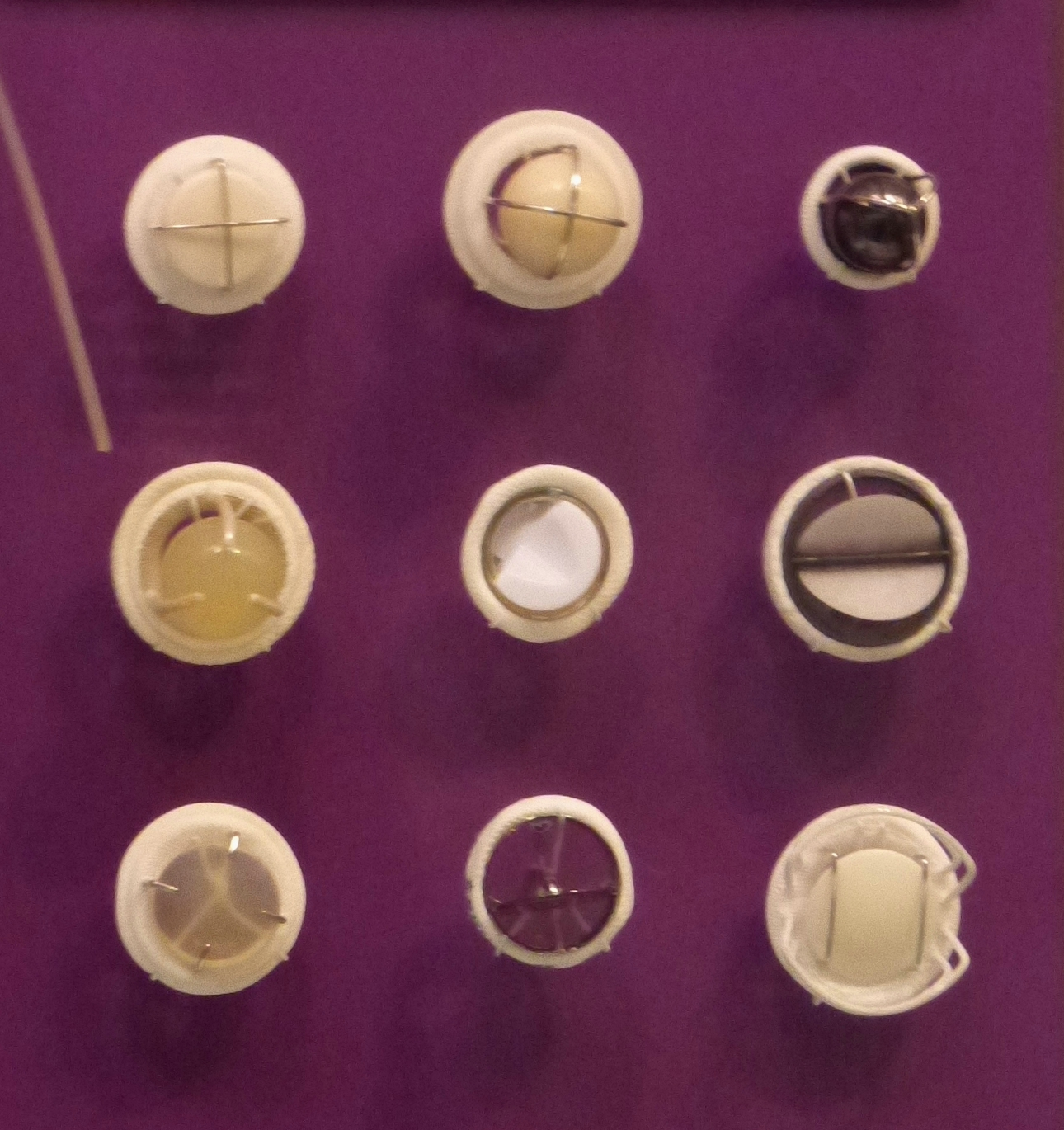
- Different types of artificial heart valves
- Specialty: Cardiology

An artificial heart valve is a one-way valve implanted into a person's heart to replace a heart valve that is not functioning properly (valvular heart disease). Artificial heart valves can be separated into three broad classes: mechanical heart valves, bioprosthetic tissue valves and engineered tissue valves.

The human heart contains four valves: tricuspid valve, pulmonary valve, mitral valve and aortic valve. Their main purpose is to keep blood flowing in the proper direction through the heart, and from the heart into the major blood vessels connected to it (the pulmonary artery and the aorta). Heart valves can malfunction for a variety of reasons, which can impede the flow of blood through the valve (stenosis) and/or let blood flow backwards through the valve (regurgitation). Both processes put strain on the heart and may lead to serious problems, including heart failure. While some dysfunctional valves can be treated with drugs or repaired, others need to be replaced with an artificial valve.

== Background ==
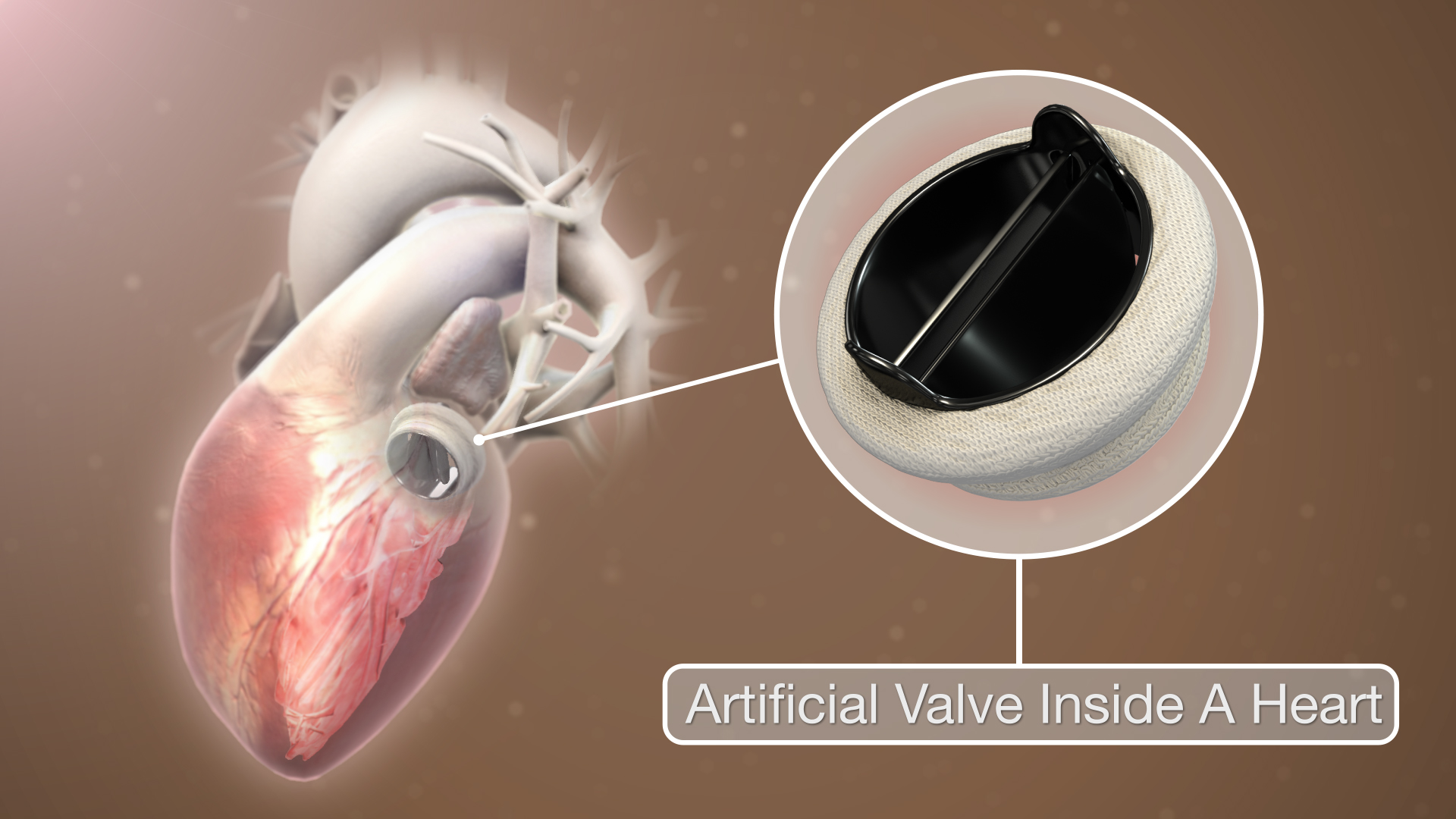
3D Medical Animation still shot of Artificial Heart Valve

A heart contains four valves (tricuspid, pulmonary, mitral and aortic valves) which open and close as blood passes through the heart. Blood enters the heart in the right atrium and passes through the tricuspid valve to the right ventricle. From there, blood is pumped through the pulmonary valve to enter the lungs. After being oxygenated, blood passes to the left atrium, where is it pumped through the mitral valve to the left ventricle. The left ventricle pumps blood to the aorta through the aortic valve.

There are many potential causes of heart valve damage, such as birth defects, age related changes, and effects from other disorders, such as rheumatic fever and infections causing endocarditis. High blood pressure and heart failure which can enlarge the heart and arteries, and scar tissue can form after a heart attack or injury.

The three main types of artificial heart valves are mechanical, biological (bioprosthetic/tissue), and tissue-engineered valves. In the US, UK and the European Union, the most common type of artificial heart valve is the bioprosthetic valve. Mechanical valves are more commonly used in Asia and Latin America. Mechanical valves

Mechanical valves come in three main types – caged ball, tilting-disc and bileaflet – with various modifications on these designs. Caged ball valves are no longer implanted. Bileaflet valves are the most common type of mechanical valve implanted in patients today.

=== First transplants ===
The first artificial heart valve was a clear plastic tube with a free-moving ball, trapped between restrictions at the inlet and outlet. The early ball check valve design opened when the heart contracted and the blood pressure in the chamber exceeded the heart's outside pressure, allowing blood to flow. When the heart finished contracting, the pressure inside the chamber dropped, allowing the ball to move back against the base of the valve to form a seal. Charles A. Hufnagel implanted his tube and ball design into ten patients (six of whom survived the operation) in 1952, marking the first heart valve transplant with limited success. For the next 8 years, Hufnagel transplants continued. However, the design was never proven or adopted as a reliable medical treatment.

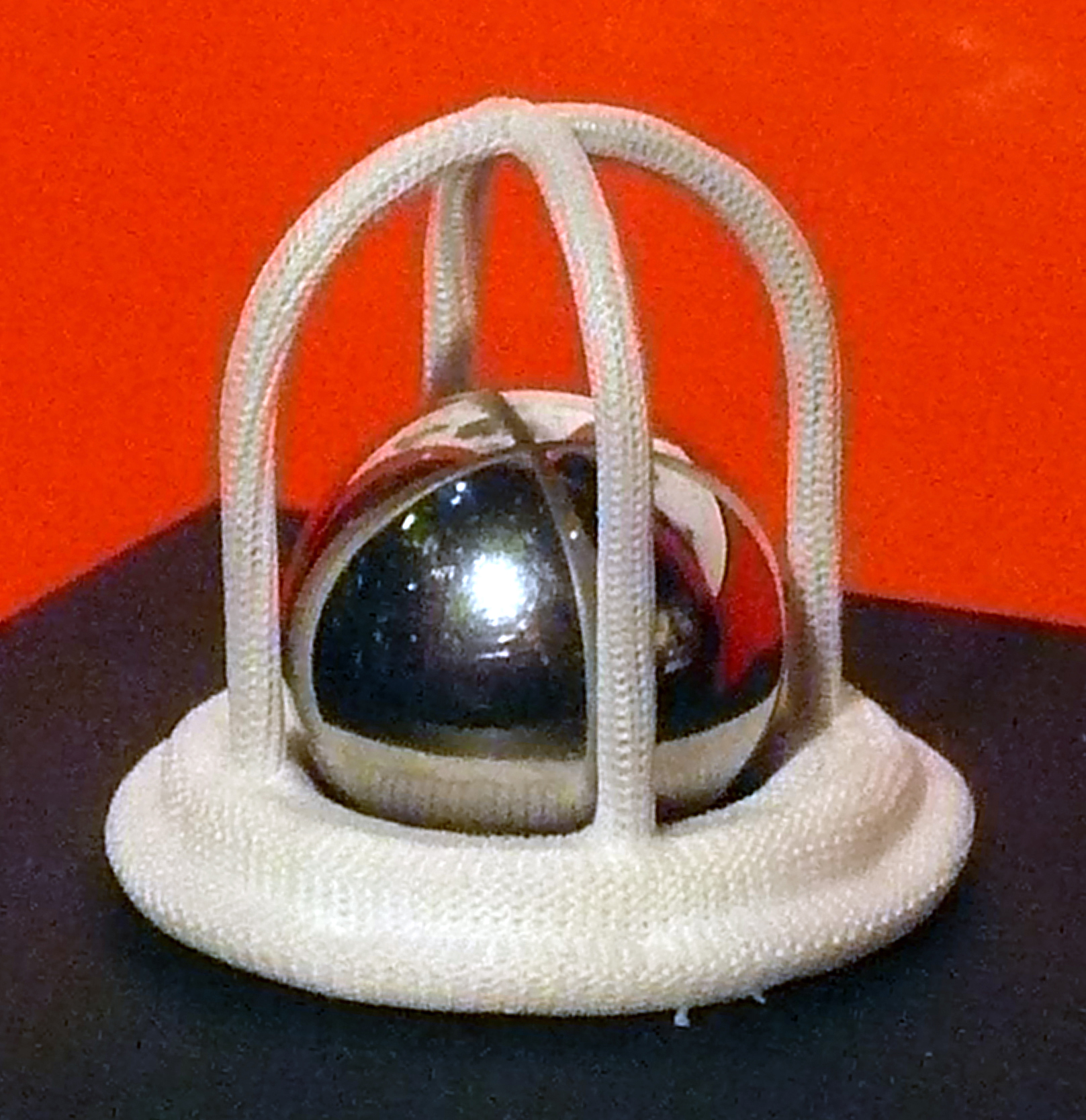
The Starr-Edwards caged ball valve.

Miles "Lowell' Edwards is recognized as the first to invent a truly safe and effective heart valve. His design relied on a patented, caged-ball check valve. Edwards' design was surgically implanted by Albert Starr for the first time in 1960 and was successfully used to save heart patients around the world for the next 47 years. The design consisted of a silicone ball enclosed in a methyl metacrylate cage welded to a ring. Edward's invention is known today as the Starr-Edwards valve, which continues to provide life-saving service for many heart patients treated before 2007. The Starr-Edwards valve set a record for providing a patient 48 years of service before requiring replacement. Mechanical heart valves, such as the Star-Edwards Valve, are strongly associated with blood clot formation and require a high dose of anticoagulant, usually with a target INR of 3.0–4.5. In 2007 the Starr-Edwards Valve was retired and replaced by Edwards Lifesciences with the Edwards Myxo ETlogix annuloplasty ring.

=== Tilting-disc valves ===
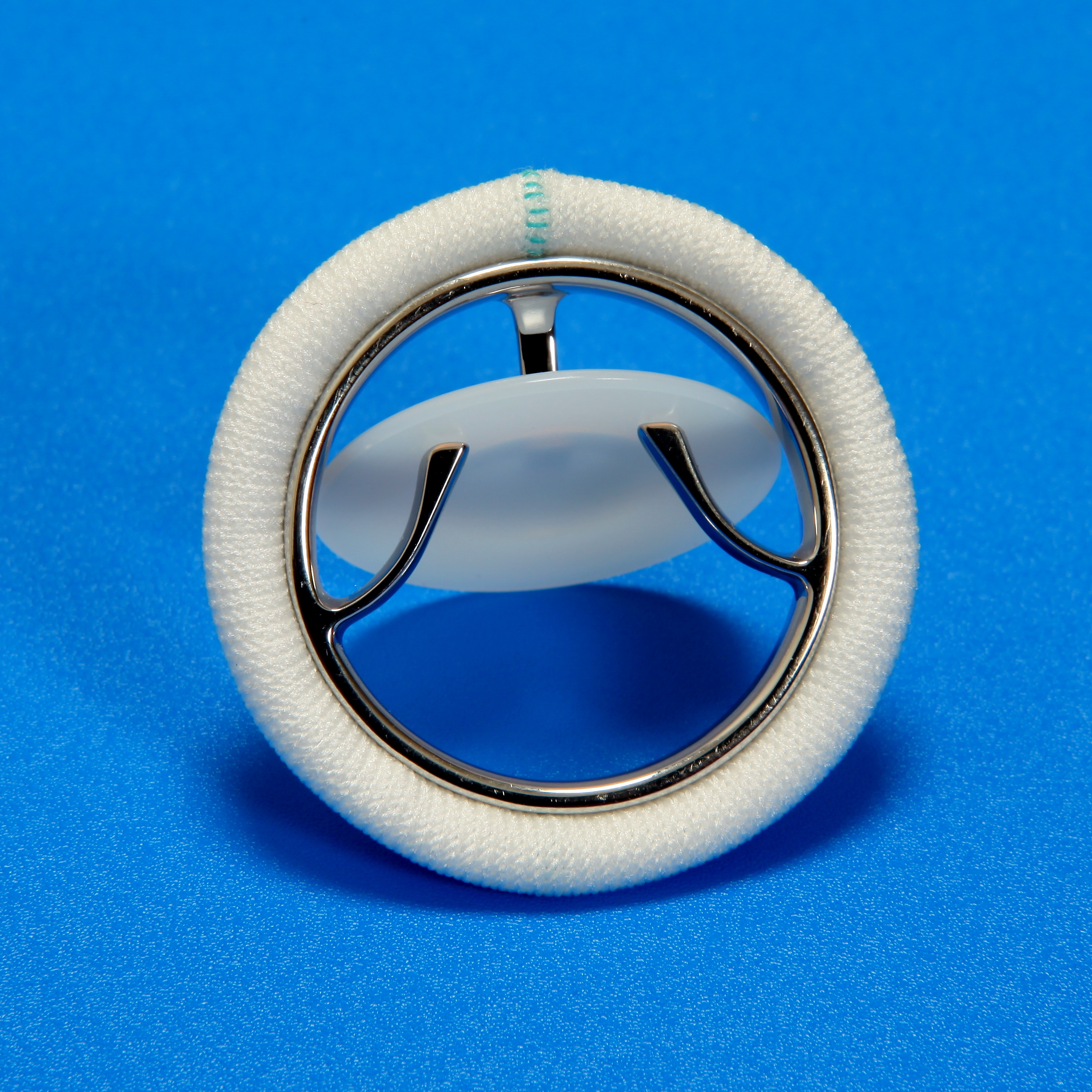
tilting-disc valve

Introduced in 1969, the first clinically available tilting-disc valve was the Bjork-Shiley valve. Tilting‑disc valves, a type of swing check valve, are made of a metal ring covered by an ePTFE fabric. The metal ring holds, by means of two metal supports, a disc that opens when the heart beats to let blood flow through, then closes again to prevent blood flowing backwards. The disc is usually made of an extremely hard carbon material (pyrolytic carbon), enabling the valve to function for years without wearing out.

=== Bileaflet valves ===
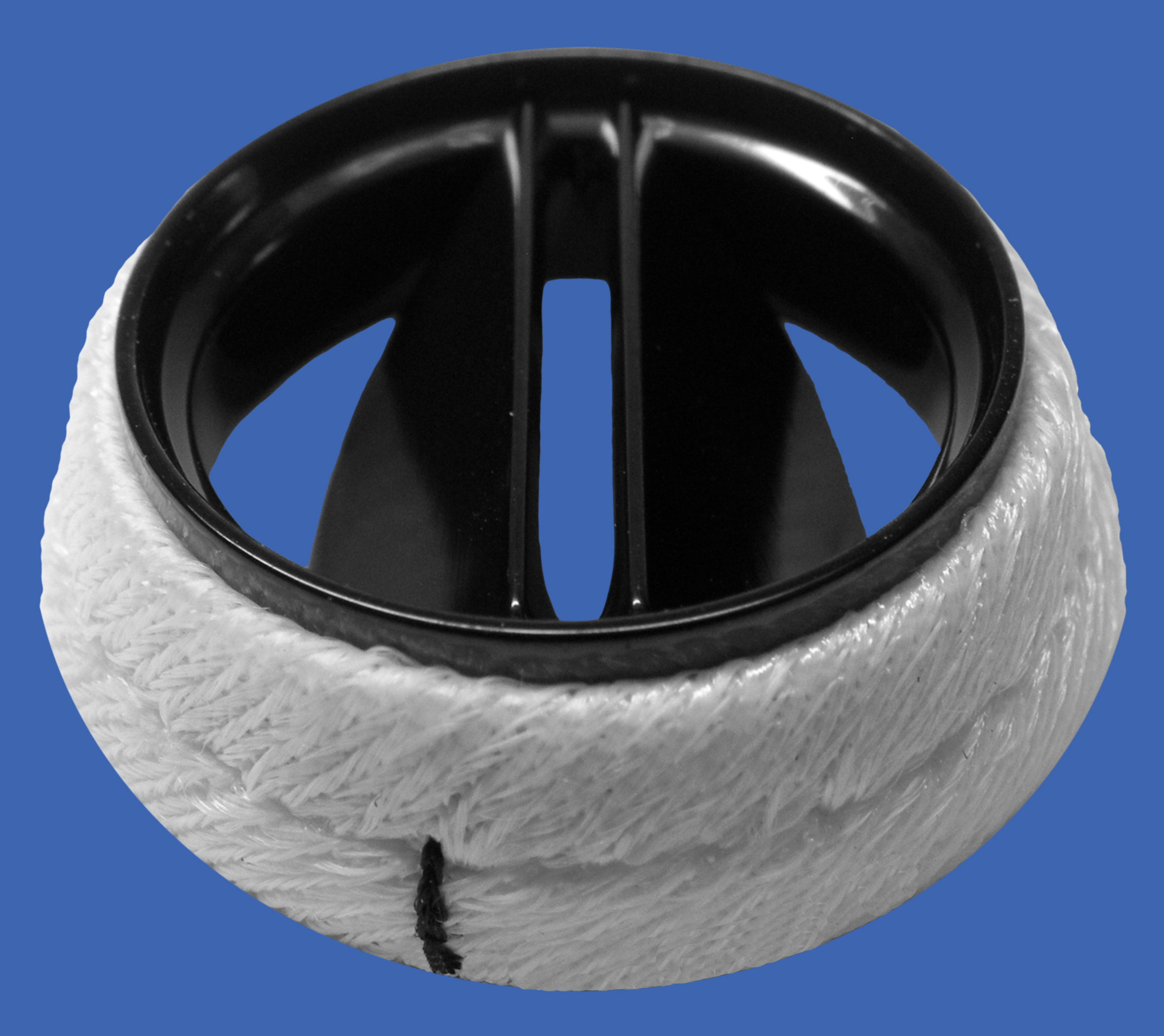
Bileaflet valve

Introduced in 1979, bileaflet valves are made of two semicircular leaflets that revolve around struts attached to the valve housing. With a larger opening than caged ball or tilting-disc valves, they carry a lower risk of blood clots. They are, however, vulnerable to blood backflow.

=== Advantages of mechanical valves ===
The major advantage of mechanical valves over bioprosthetic valves is their greater durability. Made from metal and/or pyrolytic carbon, they can last 20–30 years.

=== Disadvantages of mechanical valves ===
One of the major drawbacks of mechanical heart valves is that they are associated with an increased risk of blood clots. Clots formed by red blood cell and platelet damage can block blood vessels leading to stroke. People with mechanical valves need to take anticoagulants (blood thinners), such as warfarin, for the rest of their life. Mechanical heart valves can also cause mechanical hemolytic anemia, a condition where the red blood cells are damaged as they pass through the valve. Cavitation, the rapid formation of microbubbles in a fluid such as blood due to a localized drop of pressure, can lead to mechanical heart valve failure, so cavitation testing is an essential part of the valve design verification process.

Many of the complications associated with mechanical heart valves can be explained through fluid mechanics. For example, blood clot formation is a side effect of high shear stresses created by the design of the valves. From an engineering perspective, an ideal heart valve would produce minimal pressure drops, have small regurgitation volumes, minimize turbulence, reduce prevalence of high stresses, and not create flow separations in the vicinity of the valve.

Implanted mechanical valves can cause foreign body rejection. The blood may coagulate and eventually result in a hemostasis. The usage of anticoagulation drugs will be interminable to prevent thrombosis.

== Bioprosthetic tissue valves ==
Bioprosthetic valves are usually made from animal tissue (heterograft/xenograft) attached to a metal or polymer support. Bovine (cow) tissue is most commonly used, but some are made from porcine (pig) tissue. The tissue is treated to prevent rejection and calcification.

Alternatives to animal tissue valves are sometimes used, where valves are used from human donors, as in aortic homografts and pulmonary autografts. An aortic homograft is an aortic valve from a human donor, retrieved either after their death or from a heart that is removed to be replaced during a heart transplant. A pulmonary autograft, also known as the Ross procedure, is where the aortic valve is removed and replaced with the patient's own pulmonary valve (the valve between the right ventricle and the pulmonary artery). A pulmonary homograft (a pulmonary valve taken from a cadaver) is then used to replace the patient's own pulmonary valve. This procedure was first performed in 1967 and is used primarily in children, as it allows the patient's own pulmonary valve (now in the aortic position) to grow with the child.

=== Advantages of bioprosthetic heart valves ===
Bioprosthetic valves are less likely than mechanical valves to cause blood clots, so do not require lifelong anticoagulation. As a result, people with bioprosthetic valves have a lower risk of bleeding than those with mechanical valves.

=== Disadvantages of bioprosthetic heart valves ===
Tissue valves are less durable than mechanical valves, typically lasting 10–20 years. This means that people with bioprosthetic valves have a higher incidence of requiring another aortic valve replacement in their lifetime. Bioprosthetic valves tend to deteriorate more quickly in younger patients.

In recent years, scientists have developed a new tissue preservation technology, with the aim of improving the durability of bioprosthetic valves. In sheep and rabbit studies, tissue preserved using this new technology had less calcification than control tissue. A valve containing this tissue is now marketed, but long-term durability data in patients are not yet available.

Current bioprosthetic valves lack longevity, and will calcify over time. When a valve calcifies, the valve cusps become stiff and thick and cannot close completely. Moreover, bioprosthetic valves can't grow with or adapt to the patient: if a child has bioprosthetic valves they will need to get the valves replaced several times to fit their physical growth.

== Tissue-engineered valves ==
For over 30 years researchers have been trying to grow heart valves in vitro. These tissue‑engineered valves involve seeding human cells on to a scaffold. The two main types of scaffold are natural scaffolds, such as decellularized tissue, or scaffolds made from degradable polymers. The scaffold acts as an extracellular matrix, guiding tissue growth into the correct 3D structure of the heart valve. Some tissue-engineered heart valves have been tested in clinical trials, but none are commercially available.

Tissue engineered heart valves can be person-specific and 3D modeled to fit an individual recipient 3D printing is used because of its high accuracy and precision of dealing with different biomaterials. Cells that are used for tissue engineered heart valves are expected to secrete the extracellular matrix (ECM). Extracellular matrix provides support to maintain the shape of the valves and determines the cell activities.

Scientists can follow the structure of heart valves to produce something that looks similar to them, but since tissue engineered valves lack the natural cellular basis, they either fail to perform their functions like natural heart valves, or function when they are implanted but gradually degrade over time. An ideal tissue engineered heart valve would be non-thrombogenic, biocompatible, durable, resistant to calcification, grow with the surrounding heart, and exhibit a physiological hemodynamic profile. To achieve these goals, the scaffold should be carefully chosen—there are three main candidates: decellularized ECM (xenografts or homografts), natural polymers, and synthetic polymers.

== Differences between mechanical and tissue valves ==
Mechanical and tissue valves are made of different materials. Mechanical valves are generally made of titanium and carbon. Tissue valves are made up of human or animal tissue. The valves composed of human tissue, known as allografts or homografts, are from donors' human hearts.

Mechanical valves can be a better choice for younger people and people at risk of valve deterioration due to its durability. It is also preferable for people who are already taking blood thinners and people who would be unlikely to tolerate another valve replacement operation.

Tissue valves are better for older age groups as another valve replacement operation may not be needed in their lifetime. Due to the risk of forming blood clots for mechanical valves and severe bleeding as a major side effect of taking blood-thinning medications, people who have a risk of bleeding and are not willing to take warfarin may also consider tissue valves. Other patients who may be more suitable for tissue valves are people who have other planned surgeries and unable to take blood-thinning medications. People who plan to become pregnant may also consider tissue valves as warfarin causes risks in pregnancy.

== Functional requirements of artificial heart valves ==
An artificial heart valve should ideally function like a natural heart valve. The functioning of natural heart valves is characterized by many advantages:

- Minimal regurgitation – This means that the amount of blood leaking backwards through the valve as it closes is small. Some degree of valvular regurgitation is inevitable and natural, up to around 5 ml per beat. However, several heart valve pathologies (e.g. rheumatic endocarditis) may lead to clinically significant valvular regurgitation. A desirable characteristic of heart valve prostheses is that regurgitation is minimal over the full range of physiological heart function.
- Minimal transvalvular pressure gradient – Whenever a fluid flows through a restriction, such as a valve, a pressure gradient arises over the restriction. This pressure gradient is a result of the increased resistance to flow through the restriction. Natural heart valves have a low transvalvular pressure gradient as they present little obstruction to the flow through themselves, normally less than 16 mmHg. A desirable characteristic of heart valve prostheses is that their transvalvular pressure gradient is as small as possible.
- Non-thrombogenic – Natural heart valves are lined with an endothelium comparable with the endothelium lining the heart chambers, so they are not normally thrombogenic (i.e. they don't cause blood clots). Blood clots can be hazardous because they can lodge in, and block, downstream arteries (e.g. coronary arteries, leading to heart attack [myocardial infarction]; or cerebral arteries, leading to stroke). A desirable characteristic of artificial heart valves is that they are non- or minimally thrombogenic.
- Self-repairing – Valve leaflets retain some capacity for repair thanks to regenerative cells (e.g. fibroblasts) in the connective tissue from which the leaflets are composed. As the human heart beats approximately 3.4 billion times during a typical human lifespan, this limited but nevertheless present repair capacity is critically important. No heart valve prostheses can currently self-repair, but tissue-engineered valves may eventually offer such capabilities.

The performance of an artificial heart valve can be tested in vitro before clinical use by means of a pulse duplicator.

== Artificial heart valve repair ==
Artificial heart valves are expected to last from 10 to 30 years.

The most common problems with artificial heart valves are various forms of degeneration, including gross billowing of leaflets, ischemic mitral valve pathology, and minor chordal lengthening. The repairing process of the artificial heart valve regurgitation and stenosis usually requires an open-heart surgery, and a repair or partial replacement of regurgitant valves is usually preferred.

Researchers are investigating catheter-based surgery that allows repair of an artificial heart valve without large incisions.

Researchers are investigating Interchangeable Prosthetic Heart Valve that allows redo and fast-track repair of an artificial heart valve.

== Additional images ==
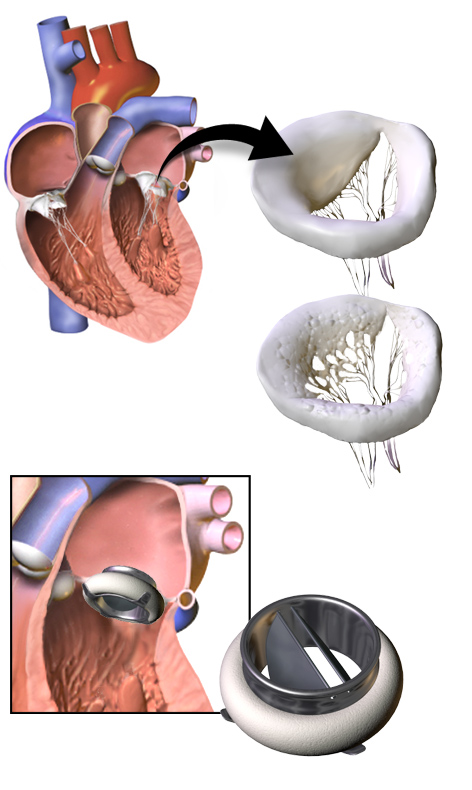
3D Rendering of Mechanical Valve

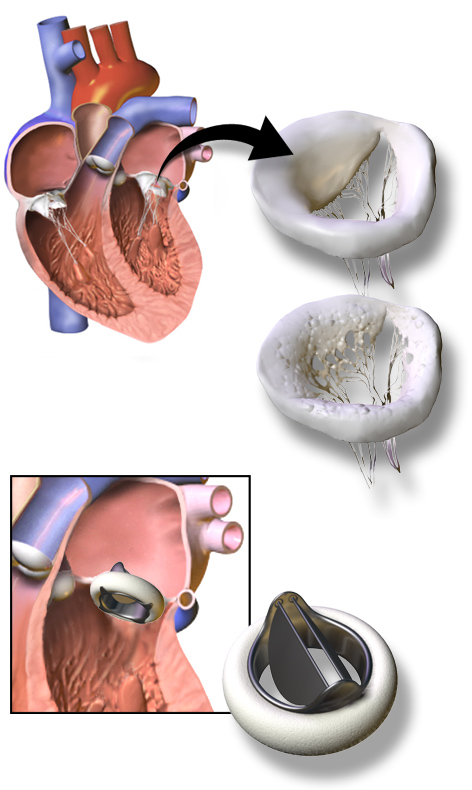
3D Rendering of Mechanical Valve (St. Francis model)

== See also ==
- Artificial heart
- Artificial pacemaker
- Mitral valve replacement
- Aortic valve replacement
