= Charles A. Hufnagel =

American surgeon (1916–1989)

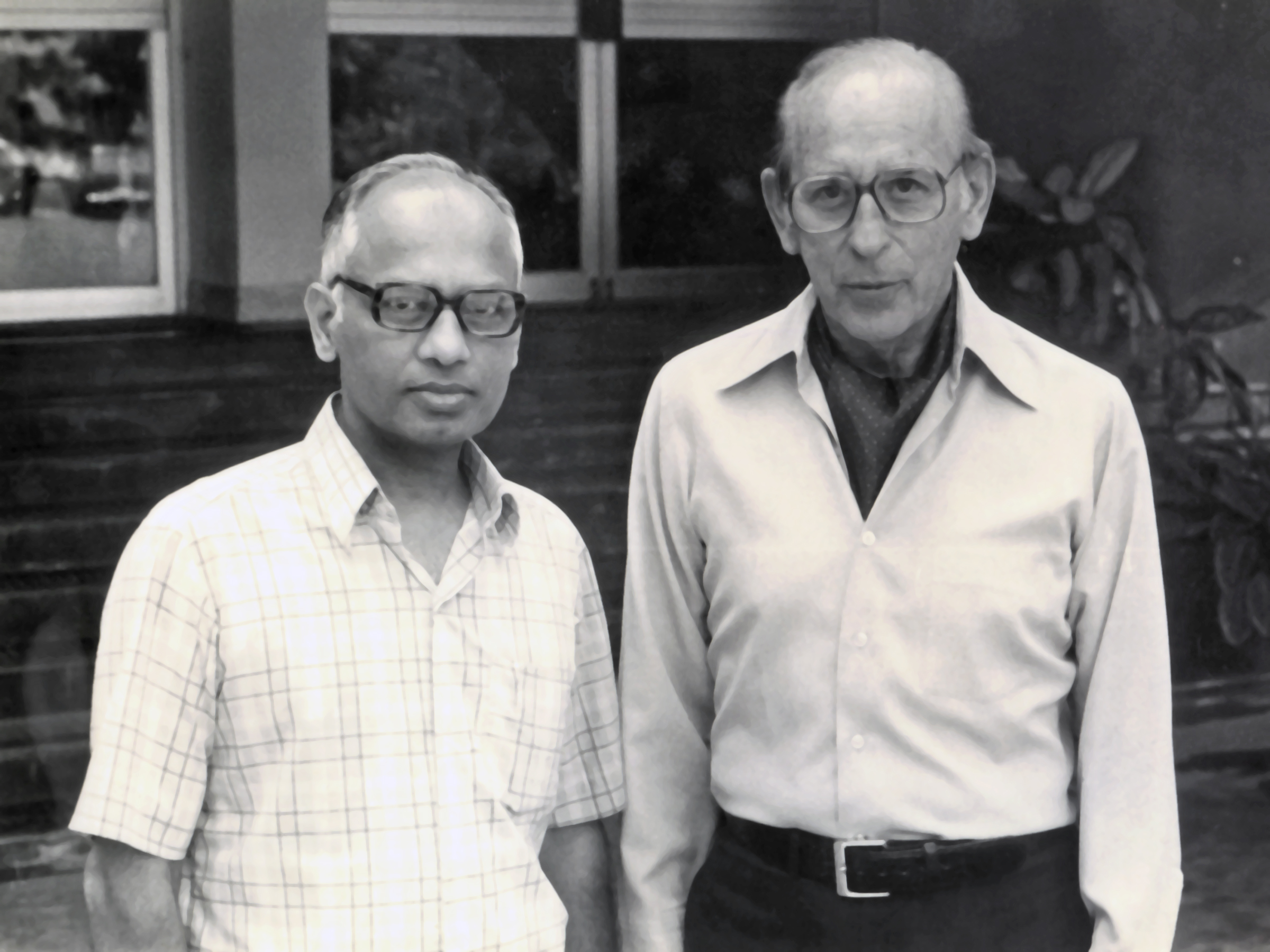
Hufnagel (right) with Dr. M. S. Valiathan.

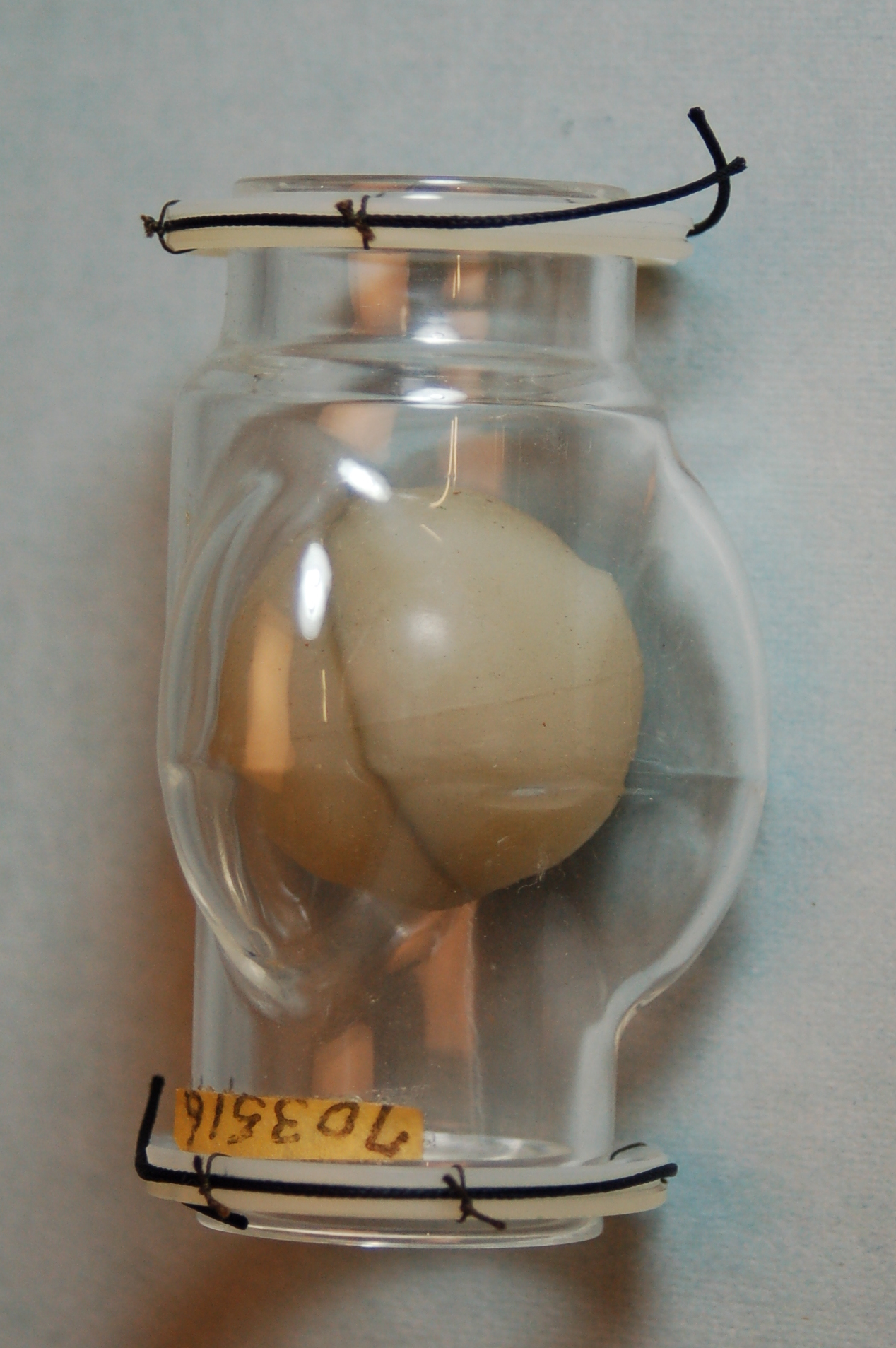
Hufnagel Artificial Heart Valve in the collection of the National Museum of Health and Medicine.

Charles A. Hufnagel, M.D. (August 15, 1916 – May 31, 1989) was an American surgeon who invented the first artificial heart valve in the early 1950s.

Hufnagel was born in Louisville, Kentucky, and reared in Richmond, Indiana. His father was also a surgeon. He graduated from the University of Notre Dame and earned his medical degree from Harvard Medical School. At Peter Bent Brigham Hospital, he began work on the heart and other organ transplants and explored the use of plastic to replace blood vessels, developing a technique called multi-point fixation, which would have great importance in the placement of the artificial aortic valve.

In 1950, Hufnagel joined the Georgetown University faculty as director of the surgical research laboratory and professor of surgery. He became chairman of the department of surgery in 1969 and held the post until 1979.

In September 1952 Hufnagel, then director of the Georgetown University Medical Center's surgical research laboratory, implanted an aortic "assist" valve into the circulatory system of a 30-year-old woman. The valve consisted of a pea-size ball of plastic inside a chambered tube—an inch and a half long and an inch thick—that regulated blood flow through the heart. The manufactured valve compensated for the faulty original valve, but did not actually replace it, while ensuring that the heart was able to pump blood successfully into the body's circulatory system.

The purpose of the aortic valve is to prevent blood from flowing backward into the heart. In the artificial valve the free-moving plastic pea in the tube was dislodged by the pulsing blood with each heartbeat, then fell back to close the tube between pulses.

The first patient to receive the plastic implant had rheumatic fever, which had severely damaged her aortic valve to the point where she was given little chance to live. Shortly after the implant, she was able to resume a normal life and lived for almost a decade with the implanted valve before dying of unrelated causes. The valve itself, however, had some drawbacks, including the fact that it "clicked" loudly enough to be heard by others. Several hundred other patients subsequently received other "Hufnagel" valves.

Hufnagel later made significant contributions to the development of the modern heart-lung machine. The principle of the early artificial aortic valve still serves as a model for heart implants.

In 1974, Hufnagel served as chairman of a three-member medical panel that evaluated the condition of President Richard M. Nixon, who had undergone pelvic surgery for a chronic phlebitis condition. The evaluation was ordered by Federal Judge John J. Sirica.

The panel determined that Nixon was too ill to testify for at least six weeks. But the medical doctors made a point of protecting the confidentiality of the President's medical records and refused to cite a reason for recommending against his testifying. Nixon never testified.

Hufnagel was a member of more than 75 surgical and academic societies in the United States, Europe and South America. He was the author of more than 400 articles in medical and other scientific journals.

Among the awards and honors he received were the American Heart Association's distinguished service award in 1969; the Modern Medicine Award, also for distinguished service, in 1961; the James F. Mitchell International Award for heart and vascular research in 1970, the Mendel Medal from Villanova University in 1965, and the John H. Gibbon Medal in 1975.

He died in Washington, D.C., on May 31, 1989, at the age of 72.
