= Alacrite =

Family of Cobalt based alloys

Alacrite (also known as Alloy L-605, Cobalt L-605, Haynes 25, and occasionally F90) is a family of cobalt-based alloys. The alloy exhibits useful mechanical properties and is oxidation- and sulfidation-resistant.

One member of the family, XSH Alacrite, is described as "a non-magnetic, stainless super-alloy whose high surface hardness enables one to achieve a mirror quality polish." The Institut National de Métrologie in France has also used the material as a kilogram mass standard.

== Composition and standardization ==
L-605 is composed primarily of cobalt (Co), with a specified mixture of chromium (Cr), tungsten (W), nickel (Ni), iron (Fe) and carbon (C), as well as small amounts of manganese (Mn), silicon (Si), and phosphorus (P). The tungsten and nickel improve the alloy's machinability, while chromium contributes to its solid-solution strengthening. The following tolerances must be met to be considered an L-605 alloy:

%	Cobalt (Co)	Chromium (Cr)	Tungsten (W)	Nickel (Ni)	Iron (Fe)	Carbon (C)	Manganese (Mn)	Silicon (Si)	Phosphorus (P)	Sulfur (S)
Minimum	Balance	19	14	9	-	0.05	1	-	-	-
Maximum		21	16	11	3	0.15	2	0.4	0.04	0.03

== Properties and Applications ==
The alloy was originally developed for application in aircraft, including combustion chambers, liners, afterburners and the hot section of gas turbines. It has also been used in aerospace components and turbine engines as well as drug-eluting and other kinds of stents due to its biocompatibility. When used for implantable medical devices, the ASTM F90-09 and ISO 5832-5:2005 specifications dictate how L-605 is manufactured and tested.
